

568001–568100 

|-bgcolor=#d6d6d6
| 568001 ||  || — || November 5, 2005 || Mount Lemmon || Mount Lemmon Survey ||  || align=right | 3.0 km || 
|-id=002 bgcolor=#E9E9E9
| 568002 ||  || — || August 23, 2014 || Haleakala || Pan-STARRS ||  || align=right | 1.8 km || 
|-id=003 bgcolor=#fefefe
| 568003 ||  || — || April 9, 2010 || Mount Lemmon || Mount Lemmon Survey ||  || align=right data-sort-value="0.58" | 580 m || 
|-id=004 bgcolor=#fefefe
| 568004 ||  || — || April 22, 2007 || Kitt Peak || Spacewatch ||  || align=right data-sort-value="0.94" | 940 m || 
|-id=005 bgcolor=#d6d6d6
| 568005 ||  || — || September 7, 2011 || Kitt Peak || Spacewatch ||  || align=right | 2.5 km || 
|-id=006 bgcolor=#d6d6d6
| 568006 ||  || — || October 1, 2011 || Kitt Peak || Spacewatch ||  || align=right | 2.6 km || 
|-id=007 bgcolor=#E9E9E9
| 568007 ||  || — || April 4, 2003 || Kitt Peak || Spacewatch ||  || align=right | 1.2 km || 
|-id=008 bgcolor=#d6d6d6
| 568008 ||  || — || November 11, 2006 || Kitt Peak || Spacewatch ||  || align=right | 2.3 km || 
|-id=009 bgcolor=#d6d6d6
| 568009 ||  || — || October 6, 2012 || Haleakala || Pan-STARRS ||  || align=right | 2.6 km || 
|-id=010 bgcolor=#d6d6d6
| 568010 ||  || — || April 1, 2003 || Apache Point || SDSS Collaboration ||  || align=right | 2.3 km || 
|-id=011 bgcolor=#fefefe
| 568011 ||  || — || December 22, 2005 || Kitt Peak || Spacewatch ||  || align=right data-sort-value="0.54" | 540 m || 
|-id=012 bgcolor=#E9E9E9
| 568012 ||  || — || February 11, 2016 || Haleakala || Pan-STARRS ||  || align=right | 1.5 km || 
|-id=013 bgcolor=#d6d6d6
| 568013 ||  || — || March 18, 2009 || Mount Lemmon || Mount Lemmon Survey ||  || align=right | 2.4 km || 
|-id=014 bgcolor=#d6d6d6
| 568014 ||  || — || March 28, 2014 || Mount Lemmon || Mount Lemmon Survey ||  || align=right | 2.3 km || 
|-id=015 bgcolor=#fefefe
| 568015 ||  || — || April 11, 2003 || Kitt Peak || Spacewatch ||  || align=right data-sort-value="0.75" | 750 m || 
|-id=016 bgcolor=#d6d6d6
| 568016 ||  || — || April 25, 2003 || Kitt Peak || Spacewatch ||  || align=right | 3.0 km || 
|-id=017 bgcolor=#E9E9E9
| 568017 ||  || — || April 25, 2003 || Kitt Peak || Spacewatch ||  || align=right | 1.3 km || 
|-id=018 bgcolor=#E9E9E9
| 568018 ||  || — || April 26, 2003 || Haleakala || AMOS ||  || align=right | 1.7 km || 
|-id=019 bgcolor=#d6d6d6
| 568019 ||  || — || April 4, 2003 || Kitt Peak || Spacewatch ||  || align=right | 2.9 km || 
|-id=020 bgcolor=#fefefe
| 568020 ||  || — || March 26, 1996 || Kitt Peak || Spacewatch ||  || align=right data-sort-value="0.81" | 810 m || 
|-id=021 bgcolor=#d6d6d6
| 568021 ||  || — || February 9, 2008 || Kitt Peak || Spacewatch ||  || align=right | 2.8 km || 
|-id=022 bgcolor=#d6d6d6
| 568022 ||  || — || May 17, 2009 || Mount Lemmon || Mount Lemmon Survey ||  || align=right | 3.0 km || 
|-id=023 bgcolor=#d6d6d6
| 568023 ||  || — || November 16, 2006 || Mount Lemmon || Mount Lemmon Survey ||  || align=right | 2.7 km || 
|-id=024 bgcolor=#d6d6d6
| 568024 ||  || — || April 28, 2003 || Kitt Peak || Spacewatch ||  || align=right | 3.0 km || 
|-id=025 bgcolor=#d6d6d6
| 568025 ||  || — || April 8, 2014 || Kitt Peak || Spacewatch ||  || align=right | 2.4 km || 
|-id=026 bgcolor=#fefefe
| 568026 ||  || — || June 5, 2014 || Haleakala || Pan-STARRS ||  || align=right data-sort-value="0.58" | 580 m || 
|-id=027 bgcolor=#fefefe
| 568027 ||  || — || August 25, 2014 || Haleakala || Pan-STARRS ||  || align=right data-sort-value="0.61" | 610 m || 
|-id=028 bgcolor=#fefefe
| 568028 ||  || — || May 7, 2014 || Haleakala || Pan-STARRS ||  || align=right data-sort-value="0.62" | 620 m || 
|-id=029 bgcolor=#E9E9E9
| 568029 ||  || — || October 24, 2013 || Mount Lemmon || Mount Lemmon Survey ||  || align=right | 1.4 km || 
|-id=030 bgcolor=#E9E9E9
| 568030 ||  || — || September 1, 2013 || Mount Lemmon || Mount Lemmon Survey ||  || align=right | 1.5 km || 
|-id=031 bgcolor=#fefefe
| 568031 ||  || — || October 21, 2011 || Kitt Peak || Spacewatch ||  || align=right data-sort-value="0.78" | 780 m || 
|-id=032 bgcolor=#d6d6d6
| 568032 ||  || — || January 12, 2018 || Mount Lemmon || Mount Lemmon Survey ||  || align=right | 2.3 km || 
|-id=033 bgcolor=#d6d6d6
| 568033 ||  || — || June 1, 2009 || Mount Lemmon || Mount Lemmon Survey ||  || align=right | 2.4 km || 
|-id=034 bgcolor=#d6d6d6
| 568034 ||  || — || November 18, 2017 || Haleakala || Pan-STARRS ||  || align=right | 2.3 km || 
|-id=035 bgcolor=#E9E9E9
| 568035 ||  || — || April 1, 2016 || Haleakala || Pan-STARRS ||  || align=right | 1.5 km || 
|-id=036 bgcolor=#E9E9E9
| 568036 ||  || — || January 21, 2015 || Catalina || CSS ||  || align=right data-sort-value="0.85" | 850 m || 
|-id=037 bgcolor=#E9E9E9
| 568037 ||  || — || May 2, 2003 || Socorro || LINEAR ||  || align=right | 1.7 km || 
|-id=038 bgcolor=#d6d6d6
| 568038 ||  || — || April 9, 2014 || Mount Lemmon || Mount Lemmon Survey ||  || align=right | 3.4 km || 
|-id=039 bgcolor=#E9E9E9
| 568039 ||  || — || May 1, 2003 || Kitt Peak || Spacewatch ||  || align=right | 2.2 km || 
|-id=040 bgcolor=#fefefe
| 568040 ||  || — || September 9, 2007 || Kitt Peak || Spacewatch ||  || align=right data-sort-value="0.74" | 740 m || 
|-id=041 bgcolor=#E9E9E9
| 568041 ||  || — || September 30, 2005 || Mount Lemmon || Mount Lemmon Survey ||  || align=right | 1.5 km || 
|-id=042 bgcolor=#d6d6d6
| 568042 ||  || — || November 3, 2005 || Kitt Peak || Spacewatch ||  || align=right | 2.9 km || 
|-id=043 bgcolor=#fefefe
| 568043 ||  || — || February 20, 2014 || Mount Lemmon || Mount Lemmon Survey ||  || align=right data-sort-value="0.94" | 940 m || 
|-id=044 bgcolor=#d6d6d6
| 568044 ||  || — || May 3, 2003 || Kitt Peak || Spacewatch ||  || align=right | 2.4 km || 
|-id=045 bgcolor=#d6d6d6
| 568045 ||  || — || April 28, 2003 || Kitt Peak || Spacewatch ||  || align=right | 2.2 km || 
|-id=046 bgcolor=#fefefe
| 568046 ||  || — || May 27, 2003 || Nogales || P. R. Holvorcem, M. Schwartz ||  || align=right data-sort-value="0.93" | 930 m || 
|-id=047 bgcolor=#d6d6d6
| 568047 ||  || — || May 27, 2003 || Mauna Kea || J. Pittichová ||  || align=right | 2.4 km || 
|-id=048 bgcolor=#E9E9E9
| 568048 ||  || — || May 22, 2003 || Kitt Peak || Spacewatch ||  || align=right | 1.2 km || 
|-id=049 bgcolor=#d6d6d6
| 568049 ||  || — || June 5, 2014 || Haleakala || Pan-STARRS ||  || align=right | 2.8 km || 
|-id=050 bgcolor=#fefefe
| 568050 ||  || — || January 10, 2013 || Haleakala || Pan-STARRS ||  || align=right data-sort-value="0.60" | 600 m || 
|-id=051 bgcolor=#d6d6d6
| 568051 ||  || — || October 18, 2011 || Mount Lemmon || Mount Lemmon Survey ||  || align=right | 2.5 km || 
|-id=052 bgcolor=#d6d6d6
| 568052 ||  || — || December 21, 2006 || Mount Lemmon || Mount Lemmon Survey ||  || align=right | 3.2 km || 
|-id=053 bgcolor=#fefefe
| 568053 ||  || — || August 28, 2014 || Haleakala || Pan-STARRS ||  || align=right data-sort-value="0.63" | 630 m || 
|-id=054 bgcolor=#d6d6d6
| 568054 ||  || — || January 3, 2012 || Mount Lemmon || Mount Lemmon Survey ||  || align=right | 1.9 km || 
|-id=055 bgcolor=#fefefe
| 568055 ||  || — || December 22, 2008 || Kitt Peak || Spacewatch ||  || align=right data-sort-value="0.66" | 660 m || 
|-id=056 bgcolor=#d6d6d6
| 568056 ||  || — || May 4, 2014 || Mount Lemmon || Mount Lemmon Survey ||  || align=right | 3.2 km || 
|-id=057 bgcolor=#d6d6d6
| 568057 ||  || — || September 17, 2017 || Haleakala || Pan-STARRS ||  || align=right | 2.9 km || 
|-id=058 bgcolor=#fefefe
| 568058 ||  || — || October 23, 2011 || Haleakala || Pan-STARRS ||  || align=right data-sort-value="0.63" | 630 m || 
|-id=059 bgcolor=#E9E9E9
| 568059 ||  || — || November 18, 2014 || Mount Lemmon || Mount Lemmon Survey ||  || align=right | 1.5 km || 
|-id=060 bgcolor=#d6d6d6
| 568060 ||  || — || May 28, 2014 || Haleakala || Pan-STARRS ||  || align=right | 2.3 km || 
|-id=061 bgcolor=#E9E9E9
| 568061 ||  || — || October 18, 2009 || Mount Lemmon || Mount Lemmon Survey ||  || align=right | 1.7 km || 
|-id=062 bgcolor=#d6d6d6
| 568062 ||  || — || January 18, 2013 || Mount Lemmon || Mount Lemmon Survey ||  || align=right | 2.6 km || 
|-id=063 bgcolor=#d6d6d6
| 568063 ||  || — || June 1, 2003 || Kitt Peak || Spacewatch ||  || align=right | 3.3 km || 
|-id=064 bgcolor=#d6d6d6
| 568064 ||  || — || June 18, 2015 || Haleakala || Pan-STARRS ||  || align=right | 2.4 km || 
|-id=065 bgcolor=#E9E9E9
| 568065 ||  || — || November 10, 2013 || Mount Lemmon || Mount Lemmon Survey ||  || align=right | 1.5 km || 
|-id=066 bgcolor=#FA8072
| 568066 ||  || — || February 3, 2016 || Haleakala || Pan-STARRS ||  || align=right data-sort-value="0.71" | 710 m || 
|-id=067 bgcolor=#E9E9E9
| 568067 ||  || — || March 30, 2011 || Mount Lemmon || Mount Lemmon Survey ||  || align=right | 1.9 km || 
|-id=068 bgcolor=#E9E9E9
| 568068 ||  || — || January 26, 2006 || Mount Lemmon || Mount Lemmon Survey ||  || align=right | 1.9 km || 
|-id=069 bgcolor=#E9E9E9
| 568069 ||  || — || June 26, 2003 || Nogales || P. R. Holvorcem, M. Schwartz ||  || align=right | 1.4 km || 
|-id=070 bgcolor=#fefefe
| 568070 ||  || — || January 1, 2016 || Haleakala || Pan-STARRS || H || align=right data-sort-value="0.71" | 710 m || 
|-id=071 bgcolor=#d6d6d6
| 568071 ||  || — || July 14, 2016 || Haleakala || Pan-STARRS ||  || align=right | 3.1 km || 
|-id=072 bgcolor=#fefefe
| 568072 ||  || — || July 3, 2003 || Kitt Peak || Spacewatch ||  || align=right data-sort-value="0.72" | 720 m || 
|-id=073 bgcolor=#E9E9E9
| 568073 ||  || — || July 3, 2003 || Kitt Peak || Spacewatch ||  || align=right | 2.2 km || 
|-id=074 bgcolor=#E9E9E9
| 568074 ||  || — || April 25, 2007 || Mount Lemmon || Mount Lemmon Survey ||  || align=right data-sort-value="0.89" | 890 m || 
|-id=075 bgcolor=#fefefe
| 568075 ||  || — || February 24, 2014 || Haleakala || Pan-STARRS ||  || align=right | 1.1 km || 
|-id=076 bgcolor=#d6d6d6
| 568076 ||  || — || March 11, 2008 || Kitt Peak || Spacewatch ||  || align=right | 2.5 km || 
|-id=077 bgcolor=#fefefe
| 568077 ||  || — || January 21, 2013 || Haleakala || Pan-STARRS ||  || align=right data-sort-value="0.84" | 840 m || 
|-id=078 bgcolor=#d6d6d6
| 568078 ||  || — || July 7, 2003 || Kitt Peak || Spacewatch ||  || align=right | 2.8 km || 
|-id=079 bgcolor=#E9E9E9
| 568079 ||  || — || July 10, 2003 || Haleakala || AMOS ||  || align=right | 2.6 km || 
|-id=080 bgcolor=#fefefe
| 568080 ||  || — || July 28, 2003 || Campo Imperatore || CINEOS ||  || align=right data-sort-value="0.63" | 630 m || 
|-id=081 bgcolor=#fefefe
| 568081 ||  || — || July 25, 2003 || Palomar || NEAT ||  || align=right data-sort-value="0.79" | 790 m || 
|-id=082 bgcolor=#fefefe
| 568082 ||  || — || July 25, 2003 || Palomar || NEAT ||  || align=right data-sort-value="0.60" | 600 m || 
|-id=083 bgcolor=#fefefe
| 568083 ||  || — || August 4, 2003 || Socorro || LINEAR ||  || align=right data-sort-value="0.81" | 810 m || 
|-id=084 bgcolor=#E9E9E9
| 568084 ||  || — || December 11, 2004 || Kitt Peak || Spacewatch ||  || align=right | 1.7 km || 
|-id=085 bgcolor=#d6d6d6
| 568085 ||  || — || May 8, 2008 || Mount Lemmon || Mount Lemmon Survey ||  || align=right | 2.7 km || 
|-id=086 bgcolor=#FA8072
| 568086 ||  || — || August 2, 2003 || Haleakala || AMOS ||  || align=right data-sort-value="0.58" | 580 m || 
|-id=087 bgcolor=#E9E9E9
| 568087 ||  || — || September 24, 2008 || Kitt Peak || Spacewatch ||  || align=right | 1.6 km || 
|-id=088 bgcolor=#FA8072
| 568088 ||  || — || July 8, 2003 || Palomar || NEAT ||  || align=right data-sort-value="0.87" | 870 m || 
|-id=089 bgcolor=#FA8072
| 568089 ||  || — || August 25, 2003 || Socorro || LINEAR ||  || align=right data-sort-value="0.58" | 580 m || 
|-id=090 bgcolor=#E9E9E9
| 568090 ||  || — || August 26, 2003 || Socorro || LINEAR ||  || align=right | 2.4 km || 
|-id=091 bgcolor=#E9E9E9
| 568091 ||  || — || August 30, 2003 || Kitt Peak || Spacewatch ||  || align=right | 1.5 km || 
|-id=092 bgcolor=#d6d6d6
| 568092 ||  || — || August 29, 2003 || Mauna Kea || Mauna Kea Obs. ||  || align=right | 2.2 km || 
|-id=093 bgcolor=#E9E9E9
| 568093 ||  || — || February 25, 2006 || Kitt Peak || Spacewatch ||  || align=right | 2.3 km || 
|-id=094 bgcolor=#E9E9E9
| 568094 ||  || — || August 23, 2003 || Palomar || NEAT ||  || align=right | 2.1 km || 
|-id=095 bgcolor=#E9E9E9
| 568095 ||  || — || August 28, 2003 || Palomar || NEAT ||  || align=right | 1.4 km || 
|-id=096 bgcolor=#E9E9E9
| 568096 ||  || — || November 5, 2013 || Haleakala || Pan-STARRS ||  || align=right | 2.8 km || 
|-id=097 bgcolor=#E9E9E9
| 568097 ||  || — || August 25, 2003 || Cerro Tololo || Cerro Tololo Obs. ||  || align=right | 1.4 km || 
|-id=098 bgcolor=#fefefe
| 568098 ||  || — || February 28, 2012 || Haleakala || Pan-STARRS ||  || align=right data-sort-value="0.52" | 520 m || 
|-id=099 bgcolor=#fefefe
| 568099 ||  || — || December 21, 2014 || Mount Lemmon || Mount Lemmon Survey ||  || align=right data-sort-value="0.61" | 610 m || 
|-id=100 bgcolor=#E9E9E9
| 568100 ||  || — || February 18, 2015 || Haleakala || Pan-STARRS ||  || align=right | 2.1 km || 
|}

568101–568200 

|-bgcolor=#E9E9E9
| 568101 ||  || — || August 20, 2003 || Campo Imperatore || CINEOS ||  || align=right | 1.1 km || 
|-id=102 bgcolor=#d6d6d6
| 568102 ||  || — || September 7, 2008 || Mount Lemmon || Mount Lemmon Survey ||  || align=right | 1.8 km || 
|-id=103 bgcolor=#E9E9E9
| 568103 ||  || — || August 22, 2003 || Campo Imperatore || A. Boattini, A. Di Paola ||  || align=right data-sort-value="0.81" | 810 m || 
|-id=104 bgcolor=#fefefe
| 568104 ||  || — || October 24, 2003 || Kitt Peak || L. H. Wasserman, D. E. Trilling ||  || align=right data-sort-value="0.51" | 510 m || 
|-id=105 bgcolor=#E9E9E9
| 568105 ||  || — || September 1, 2003 || Socorro || LINEAR ||  || align=right | 2.2 km || 
|-id=106 bgcolor=#E9E9E9
| 568106 ||  || — || August 28, 2003 || Palomar || NEAT ||  || align=right | 2.4 km || 
|-id=107 bgcolor=#fefefe
| 568107 ||  || — || September 4, 2003 || Kitt Peak || Spacewatch ||  || align=right data-sort-value="0.80" | 800 m || 
|-id=108 bgcolor=#d6d6d6
| 568108 ||  || — || March 9, 2007 || Mount Lemmon || Mount Lemmon Survey ||  || align=right | 2.1 km || 
|-id=109 bgcolor=#E9E9E9
| 568109 ||  || — || October 6, 2008 || Mount Lemmon || Mount Lemmon Survey ||  || align=right | 1.9 km || 
|-id=110 bgcolor=#E9E9E9
| 568110 ||  || — || August 23, 2003 || Cerro Tololo || Cerro Tololo Obs. ||  || align=right | 1.8 km || 
|-id=111 bgcolor=#fefefe
| 568111 ||  || — || October 20, 2007 || Mount Lemmon || Mount Lemmon Survey ||  || align=right data-sort-value="0.53" | 530 m || 
|-id=112 bgcolor=#E9E9E9
| 568112 ||  || — || September 5, 2003 || Siding Spring || G. J. Garradd, R. H. McNaught ||  || align=right | 1.2 km || 
|-id=113 bgcolor=#d6d6d6
| 568113 ||  || — || September 17, 2003 || Kitt Peak || Spacewatch ||  || align=right | 2.3 km || 
|-id=114 bgcolor=#fefefe
| 568114 ||  || — || September 16, 2003 || Kitt Peak || Spacewatch ||  || align=right data-sort-value="0.81" | 810 m || 
|-id=115 bgcolor=#E9E9E9
| 568115 ||  || — || September 18, 2003 || Palomar || NEAT || HNS || align=right | 1.3 km || 
|-id=116 bgcolor=#fefefe
| 568116 ||  || — || August 23, 2003 || Palomar || NEAT ||  || align=right data-sort-value="0.83" | 830 m || 
|-id=117 bgcolor=#E9E9E9
| 568117 ||  || — || September 19, 2003 || Kitt Peak || Spacewatch ||  || align=right | 2.5 km || 
|-id=118 bgcolor=#E9E9E9
| 568118 ||  || — || September 21, 2003 || Socorro || LINEAR ||  || align=right | 3.1 km || 
|-id=119 bgcolor=#E9E9E9
| 568119 ||  || — || September 16, 2003 || Kitt Peak || Spacewatch ||  || align=right | 1.9 km || 
|-id=120 bgcolor=#E9E9E9
| 568120 ||  || — || September 20, 2003 || Kitt Peak || Spacewatch ||  || align=right | 2.2 km || 
|-id=121 bgcolor=#E9E9E9
| 568121 ||  || — || September 19, 2003 || Kitt Peak || Spacewatch ||  || align=right | 1.7 km || 
|-id=122 bgcolor=#fefefe
| 568122 ||  || — || September 19, 2003 || Kitt Peak || Spacewatch ||  || align=right data-sort-value="0.52" | 520 m || 
|-id=123 bgcolor=#d6d6d6
| 568123 ||  || — || August 24, 2003 || Cerro Tololo || Cerro Tololo Obs. || 7:4 || align=right | 3.3 km || 
|-id=124 bgcolor=#E9E9E9
| 568124 ||  || — || September 16, 2003 || Kitt Peak || Spacewatch ||  || align=right | 1.4 km || 
|-id=125 bgcolor=#E9E9E9
| 568125 ||  || — || August 28, 2003 || Socorro || LINEAR ||  || align=right | 1.9 km || 
|-id=126 bgcolor=#d6d6d6
| 568126 ||  || — || September 20, 2003 || Palomar || NEAT || 615 || align=right | 1.6 km || 
|-id=127 bgcolor=#fefefe
| 568127 ||  || — || September 18, 2003 || Socorro || LINEAR ||  || align=right | 1.0 km || 
|-id=128 bgcolor=#E9E9E9
| 568128 ||  || — || September 18, 2003 || Kitt Peak || Spacewatch ||  || align=right | 2.0 km || 
|-id=129 bgcolor=#E9E9E9
| 568129 ||  || — || September 18, 2003 || Palomar || NEAT ||  || align=right | 2.0 km || 
|-id=130 bgcolor=#E9E9E9
| 568130 ||  || — || September 27, 2003 || Kitt Peak || Spacewatch ||  || align=right | 2.1 km || 
|-id=131 bgcolor=#E9E9E9
| 568131 ||  || — || September 18, 2003 || Kitt Peak || Spacewatch ||  || align=right | 1.9 km || 
|-id=132 bgcolor=#fefefe
| 568132 ||  || — || September 28, 2003 || Socorro || LINEAR ||  || align=right data-sort-value="0.61" | 610 m || 
|-id=133 bgcolor=#fefefe
| 568133 ||  || — || September 20, 2003 || Palomar || NEAT ||  || align=right data-sort-value="0.80" | 800 m || 
|-id=134 bgcolor=#E9E9E9
| 568134 ||  || — || September 20, 2003 || Palomar || NEAT ||  || align=right | 3.4 km || 
|-id=135 bgcolor=#E9E9E9
| 568135 ||  || — || September 20, 2003 || Palomar || NEAT ||  || align=right | 2.9 km || 
|-id=136 bgcolor=#E9E9E9
| 568136 ||  || — || October 1, 2003 || Kitt Peak || Spacewatch || EUN || align=right data-sort-value="0.96" | 960 m || 
|-id=137 bgcolor=#E9E9E9
| 568137 ||  || — || September 20, 2003 || Socorro || LINEAR ||  || align=right | 2.7 km || 
|-id=138 bgcolor=#E9E9E9
| 568138 ||  || — || September 20, 2003 || Palomar || NEAT ||  || align=right | 2.1 km || 
|-id=139 bgcolor=#E9E9E9
| 568139 ||  || — || September 21, 2003 || Kitt Peak || Spacewatch ||  || align=right | 2.2 km || 
|-id=140 bgcolor=#E9E9E9
| 568140 ||  || — || September 17, 2003 || Kitt Peak || Spacewatch ||  || align=right data-sort-value="0.88" | 880 m || 
|-id=141 bgcolor=#fefefe
| 568141 ||  || — || September 18, 2003 || Socorro || LINEAR ||  || align=right data-sort-value="0.86" | 860 m || 
|-id=142 bgcolor=#fefefe
| 568142 ||  || — || September 28, 2003 || Socorro || LINEAR ||  || align=right data-sort-value="0.70" | 700 m || 
|-id=143 bgcolor=#E9E9E9
| 568143 ||  || — || September 30, 2003 || Kitt Peak || Spacewatch ||  || align=right | 1.9 km || 
|-id=144 bgcolor=#E9E9E9
| 568144 ||  || — || October 20, 2003 || Kitt Peak || Spacewatch ||  || align=right | 1.7 km || 
|-id=145 bgcolor=#fefefe
| 568145 ||  || — || September 27, 2003 || Kitt Peak || Spacewatch ||  || align=right data-sort-value="0.70" | 700 m || 
|-id=146 bgcolor=#fefefe
| 568146 ||  || — || September 28, 2003 || Anderson Mesa || LONEOS ||  || align=right data-sort-value="0.66" | 660 m || 
|-id=147 bgcolor=#E9E9E9
| 568147 ||  || — || September 26, 2003 || Apache Point || SDSS Collaboration ||  || align=right data-sort-value="0.59" | 590 m || 
|-id=148 bgcolor=#fefefe
| 568148 ||  || — || October 23, 2003 || Kitt Peak || Spacewatch ||  || align=right data-sort-value="0.58" | 580 m || 
|-id=149 bgcolor=#E9E9E9
| 568149 ||  || — || September 26, 2003 || Apache Point || SDSS Collaboration ||  || align=right | 1.5 km || 
|-id=150 bgcolor=#fefefe
| 568150 ||  || — || September 18, 2003 || Palomar || NEAT ||  || align=right | 1.0 km || 
|-id=151 bgcolor=#E9E9E9
| 568151 ||  || — || September 18, 2003 || Kitt Peak || Spacewatch ||  || align=right | 1.5 km || 
|-id=152 bgcolor=#fefefe
| 568152 ||  || — || September 20, 2003 || Socorro || LINEAR ||  || align=right data-sort-value="0.77" | 770 m || 
|-id=153 bgcolor=#E9E9E9
| 568153 ||  || — || September 16, 2003 || Kitt Peak || Spacewatch ||  || align=right | 1.9 km || 
|-id=154 bgcolor=#fefefe
| 568154 ||  || — || September 18, 2003 || Kitt Peak || Spacewatch ||  || align=right data-sort-value="0.62" | 620 m || 
|-id=155 bgcolor=#fefefe
| 568155 ||  || — || September 18, 2003 || Kitt Peak || Spacewatch || H || align=right data-sort-value="0.51" | 510 m || 
|-id=156 bgcolor=#d6d6d6
| 568156 ||  || — || September 26, 2003 || Apache Point || SDSS Collaboration ||  || align=right | 1.7 km || 
|-id=157 bgcolor=#E9E9E9
| 568157 ||  || — || September 26, 2003 || Apache Point || SDSS Collaboration ||  || align=right | 1.7 km || 
|-id=158 bgcolor=#fefefe
| 568158 ||  || — || September 18, 2003 || Kitt Peak || Spacewatch ||  || align=right data-sort-value="0.51" | 510 m || 
|-id=159 bgcolor=#d6d6d6
| 568159 ||  || — || September 26, 2003 || Apache Point || SDSS Collaboration || 7:4 || align=right | 2.3 km || 
|-id=160 bgcolor=#d6d6d6
| 568160 ||  || — || September 26, 2003 || Apache Point || SDSS Collaboration ||  || align=right | 1.8 km || 
|-id=161 bgcolor=#E9E9E9
| 568161 ||  || — || September 18, 2003 || Kitt Peak || Spacewatch ||  || align=right | 1.8 km || 
|-id=162 bgcolor=#fefefe
| 568162 ||  || — || September 26, 2003 || Apache Point || SDSS Collaboration ||  || align=right data-sort-value="0.49" | 490 m || 
|-id=163 bgcolor=#E9E9E9
| 568163 ||  || — || September 26, 2003 || Apache Point || SDSS Collaboration ||  || align=right | 1.4 km || 
|-id=164 bgcolor=#E9E9E9
| 568164 ||  || — || September 26, 2003 || Apache Point || SDSS Collaboration ||  || align=right | 1.5 km || 
|-id=165 bgcolor=#E9E9E9
| 568165 ||  || — || September 30, 2003 || Kitt Peak || Spacewatch ||  || align=right | 1.6 km || 
|-id=166 bgcolor=#E9E9E9
| 568166 ||  || — || January 16, 2005 || Kitt Peak || Spacewatch ||  || align=right | 2.1 km || 
|-id=167 bgcolor=#fefefe
| 568167 ||  || — || February 4, 2005 || Kitt Peak || Spacewatch ||  || align=right data-sort-value="0.73" | 730 m || 
|-id=168 bgcolor=#E9E9E9
| 568168 ||  || — || September 26, 2003 || Apache Point || SDSS Collaboration ||  || align=right | 2.1 km || 
|-id=169 bgcolor=#E9E9E9
| 568169 ||  || — || September 26, 2003 || Apache Point || SDSS Collaboration ||  || align=right | 1.9 km || 
|-id=170 bgcolor=#E9E9E9
| 568170 ||  || — || September 26, 2003 || Apache Point || SDSS Collaboration ||  || align=right | 2.3 km || 
|-id=171 bgcolor=#d6d6d6
| 568171 ||  || — || September 26, 2003 || Apache Point || SDSS Collaboration ||  || align=right | 1.9 km || 
|-id=172 bgcolor=#fefefe
| 568172 ||  || — || April 10, 2005 || Kitt Peak || Spacewatch ||  || align=right data-sort-value="0.61" | 610 m || 
|-id=173 bgcolor=#E9E9E9
| 568173 ||  || — || September 26, 2003 || Apache Point || SDSS Collaboration ||  || align=right | 2.3 km || 
|-id=174 bgcolor=#d6d6d6
| 568174 ||  || — || February 9, 2005 || Mount Lemmon || Mount Lemmon Survey ||  || align=right | 1.9 km || 
|-id=175 bgcolor=#d6d6d6
| 568175 ||  || — || September 27, 2003 || Apache Point || SDSS Collaboration ||  || align=right | 2.4 km || 
|-id=176 bgcolor=#E9E9E9
| 568176 ||  || — || October 22, 2003 || Anderson Mesa || LONEOS ||  || align=right | 2.3 km || 
|-id=177 bgcolor=#E9E9E9
| 568177 ||  || — || September 27, 2003 || Apache Point || SDSS Collaboration ||  || align=right | 1.8 km || 
|-id=178 bgcolor=#E9E9E9
| 568178 ||  || — || September 28, 2003 || Kitt Peak || Spacewatch ||  || align=right | 1.8 km || 
|-id=179 bgcolor=#E9E9E9
| 568179 ||  || — || December 18, 2004 || Mount Lemmon || Mount Lemmon Survey ||  || align=right | 1.5 km || 
|-id=180 bgcolor=#fefefe
| 568180 ||  || — || April 10, 2005 || Kitt Peak || Kitt Peak Obs. ||  || align=right data-sort-value="0.52" | 520 m || 
|-id=181 bgcolor=#E9E9E9
| 568181 ||  || — || September 28, 2003 || Apache Point || SDSS Collaboration ||  || align=right | 1.2 km || 
|-id=182 bgcolor=#E9E9E9
| 568182 ||  || — || October 5, 2003 || Kitt Peak || Spacewatch ||  || align=right | 2.0 km || 
|-id=183 bgcolor=#d6d6d6
| 568183 ||  || — || September 25, 2003 || Mauna Kea || Mauna Kea Obs. ||  || align=right | 1.5 km || 
|-id=184 bgcolor=#E9E9E9
| 568184 ||  || — || September 18, 2003 || Kitt Peak || Spacewatch ||  || align=right | 1.8 km || 
|-id=185 bgcolor=#E9E9E9
| 568185 ||  || — || September 20, 2003 || Palomar || NEAT ||  || align=right | 2.1 km || 
|-id=186 bgcolor=#E9E9E9
| 568186 ||  || — || September 22, 2003 || Palomar || NEAT ||  || align=right data-sort-value="0.75" | 750 m || 
|-id=187 bgcolor=#E9E9E9
| 568187 ||  || — || September 26, 2003 || Apache Point || SDSS Collaboration ||  || align=right | 2.5 km || 
|-id=188 bgcolor=#E9E9E9
| 568188 ||  || — || October 10, 2008 || Mount Lemmon || Mount Lemmon Survey ||  || align=right | 2.4 km || 
|-id=189 bgcolor=#E9E9E9
| 568189 ||  || — || September 18, 2003 || Kitt Peak || Spacewatch ||  || align=right | 2.0 km || 
|-id=190 bgcolor=#fefefe
| 568190 ||  || — || September 18, 2003 || Kitt Peak || Spacewatch ||  || align=right data-sort-value="0.75" | 750 m || 
|-id=191 bgcolor=#E9E9E9
| 568191 ||  || — || October 1, 2008 || Kitt Peak || Spacewatch ||  || align=right | 1.7 km || 
|-id=192 bgcolor=#fefefe
| 568192 ||  || — || July 31, 2014 || Haleakala || Pan-STARRS ||  || align=right data-sort-value="0.74" | 740 m || 
|-id=193 bgcolor=#E9E9E9
| 568193 ||  || — || September 27, 2008 || Mount Lemmon || Mount Lemmon Survey ||  || align=right | 1.7 km || 
|-id=194 bgcolor=#E9E9E9
| 568194 ||  || — || September 29, 2003 || Kitt Peak || Spacewatch ||  || align=right | 2.3 km || 
|-id=195 bgcolor=#E9E9E9
| 568195 ||  || — || September 18, 2003 || Kitt Peak || Spacewatch ||  || align=right | 1.8 km || 
|-id=196 bgcolor=#E9E9E9
| 568196 ||  || — || December 13, 2013 || Mount Lemmon || Mount Lemmon Survey ||  || align=right | 2.2 km || 
|-id=197 bgcolor=#E9E9E9
| 568197 ||  || — || September 18, 2003 || Kitt Peak || Spacewatch ||  || align=right | 1.7 km || 
|-id=198 bgcolor=#fefefe
| 568198 ||  || — || September 19, 2003 || Kitt Peak || Spacewatch ||  || align=right data-sort-value="0.86" | 860 m || 
|-id=199 bgcolor=#E9E9E9
| 568199 ||  || — || November 1, 2008 || Mount Lemmon || Mount Lemmon Survey ||  || align=right | 1.9 km || 
|-id=200 bgcolor=#E9E9E9
| 568200 ||  || — || October 21, 2008 || Kitt Peak || Spacewatch ||  || align=right | 2.0 km || 
|}

568201–568300 

|-bgcolor=#E9E9E9
| 568201 ||  || — || March 2, 2006 || Mount Lemmon || Mount Lemmon Survey ||  || align=right | 2.0 km || 
|-id=202 bgcolor=#fefefe
| 568202 ||  || — || September 21, 2003 || Kitt Peak || Spacewatch ||  || align=right data-sort-value="0.84" | 840 m || 
|-id=203 bgcolor=#E9E9E9
| 568203 ||  || — || August 26, 2012 || Haleakala || Pan-STARRS ||  || align=right | 1.8 km || 
|-id=204 bgcolor=#d6d6d6
| 568204 ||  || — || April 16, 2013 || Haleakala || Pan-STARRS ||  || align=right | 3.1 km || 
|-id=205 bgcolor=#fefefe
| 568205 ||  || — || September 27, 2003 || Kitt Peak || Spacewatch ||  || align=right data-sort-value="0.57" | 570 m || 
|-id=206 bgcolor=#fefefe
| 568206 ||  || — || September 22, 2003 || Kitt Peak || Spacewatch ||  || align=right data-sort-value="0.65" | 650 m || 
|-id=207 bgcolor=#E9E9E9
| 568207 ||  || — || September 29, 2008 || Kitt Peak || Spacewatch ||  || align=right | 1.9 km || 
|-id=208 bgcolor=#fefefe
| 568208 ||  || — || April 23, 2009 || Kitt Peak || Spacewatch ||  || align=right data-sort-value="0.62" | 620 m || 
|-id=209 bgcolor=#E9E9E9
| 568209 ||  || — || September 21, 2003 || Anderson Mesa || LONEOS ||  || align=right | 2.1 km || 
|-id=210 bgcolor=#E9E9E9
| 568210 ||  || — || September 16, 2003 || Kitt Peak || Spacewatch ||  || align=right | 1.7 km || 
|-id=211 bgcolor=#E9E9E9
| 568211 ||  || — || October 20, 2008 || Kitt Peak || Spacewatch ||  || align=right | 1.8 km || 
|-id=212 bgcolor=#fefefe
| 568212 ||  || — || September 26, 2003 || Apache Point || SDSS Collaboration ||  || align=right data-sort-value="0.54" | 540 m || 
|-id=213 bgcolor=#fefefe
| 568213 ||  || — || September 5, 2016 || Mount Lemmon || Mount Lemmon Survey || H || align=right data-sort-value="0.50" | 500 m || 
|-id=214 bgcolor=#E9E9E9
| 568214 ||  || — || July 12, 2016 || Mount Lemmon || Mount Lemmon Survey ||  || align=right | 1.4 km || 
|-id=215 bgcolor=#E9E9E9
| 568215 ||  || — || September 21, 2003 || Kitt Peak || Spacewatch ||  || align=right data-sort-value="0.99" | 990 m || 
|-id=216 bgcolor=#E9E9E9
| 568216 ||  || — || June 8, 2011 || Mount Lemmon || Mount Lemmon Survey ||  || align=right data-sort-value="0.94" | 940 m || 
|-id=217 bgcolor=#E9E9E9
| 568217 ||  || — || October 6, 2008 || Mount Lemmon || Mount Lemmon Survey ||  || align=right | 2.1 km || 
|-id=218 bgcolor=#d6d6d6
| 568218 ||  || — || September 21, 2003 || Kitt Peak || Spacewatch ||  || align=right | 3.0 km || 
|-id=219 bgcolor=#E9E9E9
| 568219 ||  || — || September 6, 2012 || Mount Lemmon || Mount Lemmon Survey ||  || align=right | 2.1 km || 
|-id=220 bgcolor=#fefefe
| 568220 ||  || — || February 7, 2011 || Mount Lemmon || Mount Lemmon Survey ||  || align=right data-sort-value="0.44" | 440 m || 
|-id=221 bgcolor=#E9E9E9
| 568221 ||  || — || September 29, 2003 || Kitt Peak || Spacewatch ||  || align=right | 1.8 km || 
|-id=222 bgcolor=#E9E9E9
| 568222 ||  || — || May 31, 2011 || Mount Lemmon || Mount Lemmon Survey ||  || align=right data-sort-value="0.82" | 820 m || 
|-id=223 bgcolor=#E9E9E9
| 568223 ||  || — || December 18, 2009 || Kitt Peak || Spacewatch ||  || align=right | 2.5 km || 
|-id=224 bgcolor=#E9E9E9
| 568224 ||  || — || September 29, 2008 || Mount Lemmon || Mount Lemmon Survey ||  || align=right | 2.1 km || 
|-id=225 bgcolor=#fefefe
| 568225 ||  || — || March 20, 1996 || Kitt Peak || Spacewatch ||  || align=right data-sort-value="0.51" | 510 m || 
|-id=226 bgcolor=#d6d6d6
| 568226 ||  || — || September 20, 2003 || Palomar || NEAT ||  || align=right | 2.2 km || 
|-id=227 bgcolor=#d6d6d6
| 568227 ||  || — || September 27, 2003 || Kitt Peak || Spacewatch ||  || align=right | 1.8 km || 
|-id=228 bgcolor=#E9E9E9
| 568228 ||  || — || September 26, 2017 || Mount Lemmon || Mount Lemmon Survey ||  || align=right | 1.6 km || 
|-id=229 bgcolor=#E9E9E9
| 568229 ||  || — || September 5, 1994 || Kitt Peak || Spacewatch ||  || align=right | 1.9 km || 
|-id=230 bgcolor=#E9E9E9
| 568230 ||  || — || September 30, 2003 || Kitt Peak || Spacewatch ||  || align=right | 1.6 km || 
|-id=231 bgcolor=#d6d6d6
| 568231 ||  || — || September 21, 2003 || Kitt Peak || Spacewatch ||  || align=right | 2.0 km || 
|-id=232 bgcolor=#fefefe
| 568232 ||  || — || September 18, 2003 || Kitt Peak || Spacewatch ||  || align=right data-sort-value="0.53" | 530 m || 
|-id=233 bgcolor=#E9E9E9
| 568233 ||  || — || September 18, 2003 || Kitt Peak || Spacewatch ||  || align=right | 1.7 km || 
|-id=234 bgcolor=#E9E9E9
| 568234 ||  || — || September 19, 2003 || Palomar || NEAT ||  || align=right | 2.0 km || 
|-id=235 bgcolor=#d6d6d6
| 568235 ||  || — || September 18, 2003 || Kitt Peak || Spacewatch ||  || align=right | 1.9 km || 
|-id=236 bgcolor=#fefefe
| 568236 ||  || — || September 30, 2003 || Kitt Peak || Spacewatch ||  || align=right data-sort-value="0.66" | 660 m || 
|-id=237 bgcolor=#E9E9E9
| 568237 ||  || — || September 30, 2003 || Kitt Peak || Spacewatch ||  || align=right data-sort-value="0.82" | 820 m || 
|-id=238 bgcolor=#E9E9E9
| 568238 ||  || — || September 30, 2003 || Kitt Peak || Spacewatch ||  || align=right | 1.5 km || 
|-id=239 bgcolor=#d6d6d6
| 568239 ||  || — || September 29, 2003 || Kitt Peak || Spacewatch ||  || align=right | 2.6 km || 
|-id=240 bgcolor=#E9E9E9
| 568240 ||  || — || September 29, 2003 || Kitt Peak || Spacewatch ||  || align=right | 1.6 km || 
|-id=241 bgcolor=#d6d6d6
| 568241 ||  || — || September 17, 2003 || Kitt Peak || Spacewatch ||  || align=right | 2.0 km || 
|-id=242 bgcolor=#fefefe
| 568242 ||  || — || September 22, 2003 || Palomar || NEAT ||  || align=right data-sort-value="0.77" | 770 m || 
|-id=243 bgcolor=#fefefe
| 568243 ||  || — || October 1, 2003 || Kitt Peak || Spacewatch ||  || align=right data-sort-value="0.85" | 850 m || 
|-id=244 bgcolor=#fefefe
| 568244 ||  || — || September 16, 2003 || Kitt Peak || Spacewatch ||  || align=right data-sort-value="0.66" | 660 m || 
|-id=245 bgcolor=#fefefe
| 568245 ||  || — || October 2, 2003 || Kitt Peak || Spacewatch ||  || align=right data-sort-value="0.68" | 680 m || 
|-id=246 bgcolor=#fefefe
| 568246 ||  || — || October 2, 2003 || Kitt Peak || Spacewatch ||  || align=right data-sort-value="0.77" | 770 m || 
|-id=247 bgcolor=#E9E9E9
| 568247 ||  || — || October 2, 2003 || Kitt Peak || Spacewatch ||  || align=right data-sort-value="0.68" | 680 m || 
|-id=248 bgcolor=#fefefe
| 568248 ||  || — || September 21, 2003 || Palomar || NEAT ||  || align=right | 1.00 km || 
|-id=249 bgcolor=#E9E9E9
| 568249 ||  || — || September 28, 2003 || Kitt Peak || Spacewatch ||  || align=right | 2.0 km || 
|-id=250 bgcolor=#E9E9E9
| 568250 ||  || — || January 17, 2005 || Kitt Peak || Spacewatch ||  || align=right | 2.6 km || 
|-id=251 bgcolor=#E9E9E9
| 568251 ||  || — || August 16, 2012 || Siding Spring || SSS ||  || align=right | 2.9 km || 
|-id=252 bgcolor=#E9E9E9
| 568252 ||  || — || May 6, 2011 || Kitt Peak || Spacewatch ||  || align=right | 1.9 km || 
|-id=253 bgcolor=#fefefe
| 568253 ||  || — || October 16, 2007 || Mount Lemmon || Mount Lemmon Survey ||  || align=right data-sort-value="0.90" | 900 m || 
|-id=254 bgcolor=#E9E9E9
| 568254 ||  || — || September 22, 2008 || Mount Lemmon || Mount Lemmon Survey ||  || align=right | 2.2 km || 
|-id=255 bgcolor=#E9E9E9
| 568255 ||  || — || March 22, 2015 || Mount Lemmon || Mount Lemmon Survey ||  || align=right | 1.6 km || 
|-id=256 bgcolor=#fefefe
| 568256 ||  || — || August 15, 2013 || Haleakala || Pan-STARRS ||  || align=right data-sort-value="0.71" | 710 m || 
|-id=257 bgcolor=#E9E9E9
| 568257 ||  || — || October 1, 2003 || Kitt Peak || Spacewatch ||  || align=right | 2.0 km || 
|-id=258 bgcolor=#d6d6d6
| 568258 ||  || — || October 10, 2008 || Mount Lemmon || Mount Lemmon Survey ||  || align=right | 2.4 km || 
|-id=259 bgcolor=#E9E9E9
| 568259 ||  || — || August 10, 2015 || Haleakala || Pan-STARRS ||  || align=right | 1.1 km || 
|-id=260 bgcolor=#E9E9E9
| 568260 ||  || — || October 24, 2008 || Kitt Peak || Spacewatch ||  || align=right | 1.8 km || 
|-id=261 bgcolor=#E9E9E9
| 568261 ||  || — || May 26, 2015 || Haleakala || Pan-STARRS ||  || align=right | 1.5 km || 
|-id=262 bgcolor=#E9E9E9
| 568262 ||  || — || October 16, 2003 || Palomar || NEAT ||  || align=right | 3.5 km || 
|-id=263 bgcolor=#E9E9E9
| 568263 ||  || — || October 16, 2003 || Kitt Peak || Spacewatch ||  || align=right | 1.7 km || 
|-id=264 bgcolor=#E9E9E9
| 568264 ||  || — || October 17, 2003 || Kitt Peak || Spacewatch ||  || align=right | 1.8 km || 
|-id=265 bgcolor=#fefefe
| 568265 ||  || — || February 3, 2001 || Kitt Peak || Spacewatch ||  || align=right data-sort-value="0.84" | 840 m || 
|-id=266 bgcolor=#E9E9E9
| 568266 ||  || — || September 28, 2003 || Socorro || LINEAR ||  || align=right | 2.8 km || 
|-id=267 bgcolor=#E9E9E9
| 568267 ||  || — || October 18, 2003 || Kitt Peak || Spacewatch ||  || align=right | 1.7 km || 
|-id=268 bgcolor=#E9E9E9
| 568268 ||  || — || October 19, 2003 || Kitt Peak || Spacewatch ||  || align=right | 2.2 km || 
|-id=269 bgcolor=#E9E9E9
| 568269 ||  || — || October 1, 2003 || Kitt Peak || Spacewatch ||  || align=right | 2.0 km || 
|-id=270 bgcolor=#E9E9E9
| 568270 ||  || — || May 14, 2002 || Kitt Peak || Spacewatch ||  || align=right | 1.8 km || 
|-id=271 bgcolor=#fefefe
| 568271 ||  || — || October 21, 2003 || Palomar || NEAT ||  || align=right data-sort-value="0.71" | 710 m || 
|-id=272 bgcolor=#fefefe
| 568272 ||  || — || September 22, 2003 || Palomar || NEAT ||  || align=right data-sort-value="0.80" | 800 m || 
|-id=273 bgcolor=#E9E9E9
| 568273 ||  || — || September 27, 2003 || Kitt Peak || Spacewatch ||  || align=right | 1.7 km || 
|-id=274 bgcolor=#E9E9E9
| 568274 ||  || — || September 20, 2003 || Palomar || NEAT ||  || align=right | 2.0 km || 
|-id=275 bgcolor=#fefefe
| 568275 ||  || — || October 23, 2003 || Kitt Peak || Spacewatch ||  || align=right data-sort-value="0.61" | 610 m || 
|-id=276 bgcolor=#E9E9E9
| 568276 ||  || — || September 27, 2003 || Kitt Peak || Spacewatch ||  || align=right | 2.2 km || 
|-id=277 bgcolor=#fefefe
| 568277 ||  || — || October 22, 2003 || Kitt Peak || Spacewatch ||  || align=right data-sort-value="0.71" | 710 m || 
|-id=278 bgcolor=#E9E9E9
| 568278 ||  || — || October 23, 2003 || Kitt Peak || Spacewatch ||  || align=right | 2.3 km || 
|-id=279 bgcolor=#fefefe
| 568279 ||  || — || October 24, 2003 || Socorro || LINEAR || H || align=right data-sort-value="0.64" | 640 m || 
|-id=280 bgcolor=#E9E9E9
| 568280 ||  || — || October 27, 2003 || Socorro || LINEAR || DOR || align=right | 2.0 km || 
|-id=281 bgcolor=#E9E9E9
| 568281 ||  || — || October 17, 2003 || Kitt Peak || Spacewatch ||  || align=right | 2.8 km || 
|-id=282 bgcolor=#fefefe
| 568282 ||  || — || October 16, 2003 || Kitt Peak || Spacewatch ||  || align=right data-sort-value="0.87" | 870 m || 
|-id=283 bgcolor=#d6d6d6
| 568283 ||  || — || September 21, 2003 || Kitt Peak || Spacewatch || 7:4 || align=right | 3.5 km || 
|-id=284 bgcolor=#E9E9E9
| 568284 ||  || — || October 17, 2003 || Kitt Peak || Spacewatch ||  || align=right | 1.6 km || 
|-id=285 bgcolor=#E9E9E9
| 568285 ||  || — || September 21, 2003 || Palomar || NEAT ||  || align=right | 1.9 km || 
|-id=286 bgcolor=#d6d6d6
| 568286 ||  || — || October 1, 2003 || Kitt Peak || Spacewatch || 7:4 || align=right | 2.8 km || 
|-id=287 bgcolor=#E9E9E9
| 568287 ||  || — || September 20, 2003 || Kitt Peak || Spacewatch ||  || align=right | 2.4 km || 
|-id=288 bgcolor=#E9E9E9
| 568288 ||  || — || October 17, 2003 || Apache Point || SDSS Collaboration ||  || align=right data-sort-value="0.94" | 940 m || 
|-id=289 bgcolor=#E9E9E9
| 568289 ||  || — || October 17, 2003 || Apache Point || SDSS Collaboration ||  || align=right | 1.9 km || 
|-id=290 bgcolor=#E9E9E9
| 568290 ||  || — || October 17, 2003 || Apache Point || SDSS Collaboration ||  || align=right | 1.9 km || 
|-id=291 bgcolor=#d6d6d6
| 568291 ||  || — || October 17, 2003 || Apache Point || SDSS Collaboration ||  || align=right | 3.1 km || 
|-id=292 bgcolor=#E9E9E9
| 568292 ||  || — || September 22, 2003 || Kitt Peak || Spacewatch ||  || align=right | 2.4 km || 
|-id=293 bgcolor=#d6d6d6
| 568293 ||  || — || October 18, 2003 || Apache Point || SDSS Collaboration ||  || align=right | 2.8 km || 
|-id=294 bgcolor=#d6d6d6
| 568294 ||  || — || September 29, 2003 || Kitt Peak || Spacewatch || 7:4 || align=right | 3.4 km || 
|-id=295 bgcolor=#E9E9E9
| 568295 ||  || — || September 29, 2003 || Kitt Peak || Spacewatch ||  || align=right | 1.9 km || 
|-id=296 bgcolor=#fefefe
| 568296 ||  || — || March 9, 2005 || Mount Lemmon || Mount Lemmon Survey ||  || align=right data-sort-value="0.62" | 620 m || 
|-id=297 bgcolor=#E9E9E9
| 568297 ||  || — || September 29, 2003 || Kitt Peak || Spacewatch ||  || align=right | 1.3 km || 
|-id=298 bgcolor=#E9E9E9
| 568298 ||  || — || September 17, 2003 || Kitt Peak || Spacewatch ||  || align=right | 1.5 km || 
|-id=299 bgcolor=#d6d6d6
| 568299 ||  || — || October 19, 2003 || Apache Point || SDSS Collaboration ||  || align=right | 3.4 km || 
|-id=300 bgcolor=#E9E9E9
| 568300 ||  || — || September 30, 2003 || Kitt Peak || Spacewatch || GEF || align=right data-sort-value="0.78" | 780 m || 
|}

568301–568400 

|-bgcolor=#E9E9E9
| 568301 ||  || — || October 19, 2003 || Kitt Peak || Spacewatch ||  || align=right | 1.7 km || 
|-id=302 bgcolor=#fefefe
| 568302 ||  || — || September 29, 2003 || Apache Point || SDSS Collaboration ||  || align=right data-sort-value="0.80" | 800 m || 
|-id=303 bgcolor=#E9E9E9
| 568303 ||  || — || October 19, 2003 || Apache Point || SDSS Collaboration ||  || align=right data-sort-value="0.59" | 590 m || 
|-id=304 bgcolor=#fefefe
| 568304 ||  || — || October 19, 2003 || Apache Point || SDSS Collaboration ||  || align=right data-sort-value="0.82" | 820 m || 
|-id=305 bgcolor=#d6d6d6
| 568305 ||  || — || October 19, 2003 || Apache Point || SDSS Collaboration ||  || align=right | 1.6 km || 
|-id=306 bgcolor=#E9E9E9
| 568306 ||  || — || January 17, 2005 || Kitt Peak || Spacewatch || AGN || align=right | 1.1 km || 
|-id=307 bgcolor=#E9E9E9
| 568307 ||  || — || October 19, 2003 || Apache Point || SDSS Collaboration ||  || align=right | 1.6 km || 
|-id=308 bgcolor=#E9E9E9
| 568308 ||  || — || October 19, 2003 || Apache Point || SDSS Collaboration ||  || align=right | 1.8 km || 
|-id=309 bgcolor=#E9E9E9
| 568309 ||  || — || October 19, 2003 || Apache Point || SDSS Collaboration ||  || align=right | 1.2 km || 
|-id=310 bgcolor=#E9E9E9
| 568310 ||  || — || October 19, 2003 || Kitt Peak || Spacewatch ||  || align=right | 2.6 km || 
|-id=311 bgcolor=#E9E9E9
| 568311 ||  || — || October 19, 2003 || Kitt Peak || Spacewatch ||  || align=right | 1.7 km || 
|-id=312 bgcolor=#E9E9E9
| 568312 ||  || — || October 20, 2003 || Kitt Peak || Spacewatch ||  || align=right | 1.8 km || 
|-id=313 bgcolor=#E9E9E9
| 568313 ||  || — || October 20, 2003 || Kitt Peak || Spacewatch ||  || align=right | 1.6 km || 
|-id=314 bgcolor=#fefefe
| 568314 ||  || — || October 20, 2003 || Kitt Peak || Spacewatch ||  || align=right data-sort-value="0.70" | 700 m || 
|-id=315 bgcolor=#d6d6d6
| 568315 ||  || — || October 22, 2003 || Apache Point || SDSS Collaboration ||  || align=right | 3.4 km || 
|-id=316 bgcolor=#d6d6d6
| 568316 ||  || — || November 20, 2004 || Kitt Peak || Spacewatch ||  || align=right | 3.5 km || 
|-id=317 bgcolor=#E9E9E9
| 568317 ||  || — || September 16, 2003 || Palomar || NEAT ||  || align=right data-sort-value="0.94" | 940 m || 
|-id=318 bgcolor=#E9E9E9
| 568318 ||  || — || October 22, 2003 || Apache Point || SDSS Collaboration ||  || align=right | 1.8 km || 
|-id=319 bgcolor=#E9E9E9
| 568319 ||  || — || October 5, 2003 || Kitt Peak || Spacewatch ||  || align=right | 2.4 km || 
|-id=320 bgcolor=#E9E9E9
| 568320 ||  || — || September 26, 2003 || Apache Point || SDSS Collaboration ||  || align=right | 1.8 km || 
|-id=321 bgcolor=#E9E9E9
| 568321 ||  || — || October 22, 2003 || Kitt Peak || Spacewatch ||  || align=right | 1.7 km || 
|-id=322 bgcolor=#E9E9E9
| 568322 ||  || — || October 22, 2003 || Apache Point || SDSS Collaboration ||  || align=right | 1.9 km || 
|-id=323 bgcolor=#E9E9E9
| 568323 ||  || — || October 22, 2003 || Apache Point || SDSS Collaboration ||  || align=right | 1.9 km || 
|-id=324 bgcolor=#E9E9E9
| 568324 ||  || — || September 22, 2003 || Kitt Peak || Spacewatch ||  || align=right | 1.5 km || 
|-id=325 bgcolor=#E9E9E9
| 568325 ||  || — || January 16, 2005 || Kitt Peak || Spacewatch ||  || align=right | 2.1 km || 
|-id=326 bgcolor=#E9E9E9
| 568326 ||  || — || October 23, 2003 || Apache Point || SDSS Collaboration ||  || align=right | 1.7 km || 
|-id=327 bgcolor=#E9E9E9
| 568327 ||  || — || October 23, 2003 || Apache Point || SDSS Collaboration ||  || align=right | 1.3 km || 
|-id=328 bgcolor=#E9E9E9
| 568328 ||  || — || October 20, 2003 || Kitt Peak || Spacewatch ||  || align=right | 1.1 km || 
|-id=329 bgcolor=#E9E9E9
| 568329 ||  || — || October 23, 2003 || Kitt Peak || Spacewatch ||  || align=right | 2.1 km || 
|-id=330 bgcolor=#fefefe
| 568330 ||  || — || October 23, 2003 || Kitt Peak || Spacewatch ||  || align=right data-sort-value="0.83" | 830 m || 
|-id=331 bgcolor=#d6d6d6
| 568331 ||  || — || October 29, 2003 || Kitt Peak || Spacewatch ||  || align=right | 2.4 km || 
|-id=332 bgcolor=#E9E9E9
| 568332 ||  || — || February 4, 2005 || Mount Lemmon || Mount Lemmon Survey ||  || align=right | 2.0 km || 
|-id=333 bgcolor=#E9E9E9
| 568333 ||  || — || January 13, 2005 || Kitt Peak || Spacewatch ||  || align=right | 1.7 km || 
|-id=334 bgcolor=#E9E9E9
| 568334 ||  || — || October 19, 2003 || Kitt Peak || Spacewatch ||  || align=right | 2.0 km || 
|-id=335 bgcolor=#E9E9E9
| 568335 ||  || — || October 10, 2012 || Nogales || M. Schwartz, P. R. Holvorcem ||  || align=right | 2.6 km || 
|-id=336 bgcolor=#d6d6d6
| 568336 ||  || — || September 21, 2009 || Mount Lemmon || Mount Lemmon Survey || 7:4 || align=right | 3.2 km || 
|-id=337 bgcolor=#E9E9E9
| 568337 ||  || — || October 27, 2003 || Kitt Peak || Spacewatch ||  || align=right | 2.0 km || 
|-id=338 bgcolor=#E9E9E9
| 568338 ||  || — || October 21, 2008 || Kitt Peak || Spacewatch ||  || align=right | 2.4 km || 
|-id=339 bgcolor=#d6d6d6
| 568339 ||  || — || December 26, 2011 || Mount Lemmon || Mount Lemmon Survey || 7:4 || align=right | 3.9 km || 
|-id=340 bgcolor=#d6d6d6
| 568340 ||  || — || October 23, 2003 || Apache Point || SDSS Collaboration ||  || align=right | 2.4 km || 
|-id=341 bgcolor=#E9E9E9
| 568341 ||  || — || February 9, 2005 || Kitt Peak || Spacewatch ||  || align=right | 1.9 km || 
|-id=342 bgcolor=#d6d6d6
| 568342 ||  || — || February 15, 2010 || Kitt Peak || Spacewatch ||  || align=right | 1.6 km || 
|-id=343 bgcolor=#E9E9E9
| 568343 ||  || — || August 24, 2012 || Mayhill-ISON || L. Elenin ||  || align=right | 2.2 km || 
|-id=344 bgcolor=#fefefe
| 568344 ||  || — || April 13, 2013 || Haleakala || Pan-STARRS ||  || align=right data-sort-value="0.85" | 850 m || 
|-id=345 bgcolor=#E9E9E9
| 568345 ||  || — || December 22, 2012 || Piszkesteto || K. Sárneczky, G. Hodosán ||  || align=right | 1.1 km || 
|-id=346 bgcolor=#E9E9E9
| 568346 ||  || — || September 18, 2012 || Mount Lemmon || Mount Lemmon Survey ||  || align=right | 1.8 km || 
|-id=347 bgcolor=#E9E9E9
| 568347 ||  || — || June 3, 2011 || Kitt Peak || Spacewatch ||  || align=right | 1.9 km || 
|-id=348 bgcolor=#E9E9E9
| 568348 ||  || — || October 6, 2012 || Haleakala || Pan-STARRS ||  || align=right | 2.1 km || 
|-id=349 bgcolor=#E9E9E9
| 568349 ||  || — || September 22, 2012 || Kitt Peak || Spacewatch ||  || align=right | 1.9 km || 
|-id=350 bgcolor=#d6d6d6
| 568350 ||  || — || January 19, 2015 || Mount Lemmon || Mount Lemmon Survey ||  || align=right | 1.8 km || 
|-id=351 bgcolor=#fefefe
| 568351 ||  || — || October 24, 2003 || Apache Point || SDSS Collaboration ||  || align=right data-sort-value="0.68" | 680 m || 
|-id=352 bgcolor=#E9E9E9
| 568352 ||  || — || May 22, 2011 || Mount Lemmon || Mount Lemmon Survey ||  || align=right | 2.0 km || 
|-id=353 bgcolor=#E9E9E9
| 568353 ||  || — || November 21, 2008 || Mount Lemmon || Mount Lemmon Survey ||  || align=right | 1.6 km || 
|-id=354 bgcolor=#E9E9E9
| 568354 ||  || — || September 25, 2008 || Kitt Peak || Spacewatch ||  || align=right | 1.7 km || 
|-id=355 bgcolor=#E9E9E9
| 568355 ||  || — || November 7, 2008 || Mount Lemmon || Mount Lemmon Survey ||  || align=right | 1.5 km || 
|-id=356 bgcolor=#d6d6d6
| 568356 ||  || — || October 3, 2013 || Kitt Peak || Spacewatch ||  || align=right | 1.8 km || 
|-id=357 bgcolor=#E9E9E9
| 568357 ||  || — || August 25, 2012 || Kitt Peak || Spacewatch ||  || align=right | 2.4 km || 
|-id=358 bgcolor=#E9E9E9
| 568358 ||  || — || September 21, 2012 || Mount Lemmon || Mount Lemmon Survey ||  || align=right | 1.7 km || 
|-id=359 bgcolor=#E9E9E9
| 568359 ||  || — || October 19, 2003 || Kitt Peak || Spacewatch ||  || align=right | 1.8 km || 
|-id=360 bgcolor=#fefefe
| 568360 ||  || — || October 18, 2003 || Kitt Peak || Spacewatch ||  || align=right data-sort-value="0.53" | 530 m || 
|-id=361 bgcolor=#E9E9E9
| 568361 ||  || — || October 19, 2003 || Apache Point || SDSS Collaboration ||  || align=right | 1.7 km || 
|-id=362 bgcolor=#fefefe
| 568362 ||  || — || February 23, 2015 || Haleakala || Pan-STARRS ||  || align=right data-sort-value="0.55" | 550 m || 
|-id=363 bgcolor=#E9E9E9
| 568363 ||  || — || March 24, 2015 || Mount Lemmon || Mount Lemmon Survey ||  || align=right | 1.5 km || 
|-id=364 bgcolor=#fefefe
| 568364 ||  || — || January 17, 2016 || Haleakala || Pan-STARRS ||  || align=right data-sort-value="0.58" | 580 m || 
|-id=365 bgcolor=#fefefe
| 568365 ||  || — || August 31, 2014 || Haleakala || Pan-STARRS ||  || align=right data-sort-value="0.66" | 660 m || 
|-id=366 bgcolor=#d6d6d6
| 568366 ||  || — || April 25, 2007 || Mount Lemmon || Mount Lemmon Survey ||  || align=right | 2.7 km || 
|-id=367 bgcolor=#fefefe
| 568367 ||  || — || October 22, 2003 || Kitt Peak || Spacewatch ||  || align=right data-sort-value="0.71" | 710 m || 
|-id=368 bgcolor=#E9E9E9
| 568368 ||  || — || October 22, 2003 || Apache Point || SDSS Collaboration ||  || align=right | 1.6 km || 
|-id=369 bgcolor=#d6d6d6
| 568369 ||  || — || September 28, 2009 || Kitt Peak || Spacewatch || 7:4 || align=right | 3.8 km || 
|-id=370 bgcolor=#E9E9E9
| 568370 ||  || — || October 19, 2003 || Apache Point || SDSS Collaboration ||  || align=right | 1.8 km || 
|-id=371 bgcolor=#E9E9E9
| 568371 ||  || — || October 12, 1999 || Kitt Peak || Spacewatch ||  || align=right data-sort-value="0.62" | 620 m || 
|-id=372 bgcolor=#fefefe
| 568372 ||  || — || April 15, 2005 || Kitt Peak || Spacewatch || H || align=right data-sort-value="0.54" | 540 m || 
|-id=373 bgcolor=#E9E9E9
| 568373 ||  || — || January 1, 2014 || Haleakala || Pan-STARRS ||  || align=right | 1.9 km || 
|-id=374 bgcolor=#E9E9E9
| 568374 ||  || — || September 27, 2017 || Mount Lemmon || Mount Lemmon Survey ||  || align=right | 1.8 km || 
|-id=375 bgcolor=#E9E9E9
| 568375 ||  || — || April 30, 2011 || Mount Lemmon || Mount Lemmon Survey ||  || align=right | 2.1 km || 
|-id=376 bgcolor=#E9E9E9
| 568376 ||  || — || April 13, 2011 || Haleakala || Pan-STARRS ||  || align=right | 2.3 km || 
|-id=377 bgcolor=#d6d6d6
| 568377 ||  || — || October 24, 2003 || Kitt Peak || Spacewatch ||  || align=right | 2.4 km || 
|-id=378 bgcolor=#E9E9E9
| 568378 ||  || — || December 5, 2008 || Kitt Peak || Spacewatch ||  || align=right | 1.8 km || 
|-id=379 bgcolor=#fefefe
| 568379 ||  || — || September 20, 2014 || Haleakala || Pan-STARRS ||  || align=right data-sort-value="0.62" | 620 m || 
|-id=380 bgcolor=#fefefe
| 568380 ||  || — || January 11, 2008 || Mount Lemmon || Mount Lemmon Survey ||  || align=right data-sort-value="0.68" | 680 m || 
|-id=381 bgcolor=#d6d6d6
| 568381 ||  || — || September 22, 2008 || Kitt Peak || Spacewatch ||  || align=right | 2.2 km || 
|-id=382 bgcolor=#E9E9E9
| 568382 ||  || — || August 10, 2007 || Kitt Peak || Spacewatch ||  || align=right | 2.0 km || 
|-id=383 bgcolor=#E9E9E9
| 568383 ||  || — || December 11, 2013 || Haleakala || Pan-STARRS ||  || align=right | 2.0 km || 
|-id=384 bgcolor=#E9E9E9
| 568384 ||  || — || October 21, 2003 || Kitt Peak || Spacewatch ||  || align=right | 1.7 km || 
|-id=385 bgcolor=#E9E9E9
| 568385 ||  || — || November 2, 2008 || Mount Lemmon || Mount Lemmon Survey ||  || align=right | 1.6 km || 
|-id=386 bgcolor=#E9E9E9
| 568386 ||  || — || October 17, 2003 || Kitt Peak || Spacewatch ||  || align=right | 1.8 km || 
|-id=387 bgcolor=#E9E9E9
| 568387 ||  || — || August 26, 2012 || Haleakala || Pan-STARRS ||  || align=right | 1.6 km || 
|-id=388 bgcolor=#d6d6d6
| 568388 ||  || — || December 14, 2010 || Mount Lemmon || Mount Lemmon Survey || 7:4 || align=right | 2.7 km || 
|-id=389 bgcolor=#fefefe
| 568389 ||  || — || October 24, 2003 || Apache Point || SDSS Collaboration ||  || align=right data-sort-value="0.65" | 650 m || 
|-id=390 bgcolor=#fefefe
| 568390 ||  || — || November 14, 2003 || Palomar || NEAT || H || align=right data-sort-value="0.87" | 870 m || 
|-id=391 bgcolor=#d6d6d6
| 568391 ||  || — || November 15, 2003 || Kitt Peak || Spacewatch ||  || align=right | 2.1 km || 
|-id=392 bgcolor=#fefefe
| 568392 ||  || — || October 20, 2003 || Kitt Peak || Spacewatch ||  || align=right data-sort-value="0.59" | 590 m || 
|-id=393 bgcolor=#fefefe
| 568393 ||  || — || November 11, 2007 || Mount Lemmon || Mount Lemmon Survey ||  || align=right data-sort-value="0.66" | 660 m || 
|-id=394 bgcolor=#fefefe
| 568394 ||  || — || November 15, 2003 || Kitt Peak || Spacewatch ||  || align=right data-sort-value="0.63" | 630 m || 
|-id=395 bgcolor=#fefefe
| 568395 ||  || — || October 16, 2003 || Palomar || NEAT || H || align=right data-sort-value="0.59" | 590 m || 
|-id=396 bgcolor=#fefefe
| 568396 ||  || — || November 18, 2003 || Palomar || NEAT || NYS || align=right data-sort-value="0.77" | 770 m || 
|-id=397 bgcolor=#d6d6d6
| 568397 ||  || — || November 21, 2003 || Kitt Peak || Spacewatch ||  || align=right | 1.9 km || 
|-id=398 bgcolor=#d6d6d6
| 568398 ||  || — || November 30, 2003 || Kitt Peak || Spacewatch ||  || align=right | 2.2 km || 
|-id=399 bgcolor=#fefefe
| 568399 ||  || — || November 19, 2003 || Kitt Peak || Spacewatch ||  || align=right data-sort-value="0.76" | 760 m || 
|-id=400 bgcolor=#E9E9E9
| 568400 ||  || — || November 20, 2003 || Kitt Peak || Kitt Peak Obs. ||  || align=right | 1.8 km || 
|}

568401–568500 

|-bgcolor=#E9E9E9
| 568401 ||  || — || November 22, 2003 || Kitt Peak || Kitt Peak Obs. ||  || align=right | 1.9 km || 
|-id=402 bgcolor=#E9E9E9
| 568402 ||  || — || November 22, 2003 || Kitt Peak || Kitt Peak Obs. ||  || align=right | 1.9 km || 
|-id=403 bgcolor=#fefefe
| 568403 ||  || — || October 21, 2003 || Kitt Peak || Spacewatch ||  || align=right data-sort-value="0.57" | 570 m || 
|-id=404 bgcolor=#E9E9E9
| 568404 ||  || — || November 19, 2003 || Kitt Peak || Spacewatch ||  || align=right | 1.5 km || 
|-id=405 bgcolor=#fefefe
| 568405 ||  || — || April 5, 2005 || Mount Lemmon || Mount Lemmon Survey ||  || align=right data-sort-value="0.52" | 520 m || 
|-id=406 bgcolor=#d6d6d6
| 568406 ||  || — || March 18, 2010 || Mount Lemmon || Mount Lemmon Survey ||  || align=right | 2.0 km || 
|-id=407 bgcolor=#E9E9E9
| 568407 ||  || — || August 26, 2012 || Catalina || CSS ||  || align=right | 2.3 km || 
|-id=408 bgcolor=#fefefe
| 568408 ||  || — || November 26, 2003 || Kitt Peak || Spacewatch ||  || align=right data-sort-value="0.68" | 680 m || 
|-id=409 bgcolor=#E9E9E9
| 568409 ||  || — || October 20, 2012 || Haleakala || Pan-STARRS ||  || align=right | 1.2 km || 
|-id=410 bgcolor=#E9E9E9
| 568410 ||  || — || October 8, 2012 || Haleakala || Pan-STARRS ||  || align=right | 1.7 km || 
|-id=411 bgcolor=#fefefe
| 568411 ||  || — || August 28, 2006 || Catalina || CSS ||  || align=right data-sort-value="0.54" | 540 m || 
|-id=412 bgcolor=#fefefe
| 568412 ||  || — || November 20, 2003 || Kitt Peak || Spacewatch ||  || align=right data-sort-value="0.62" | 620 m || 
|-id=413 bgcolor=#d6d6d6
| 568413 ||  || — || September 15, 2007 || Mount Lemmon || Mount Lemmon Survey ||  || align=right | 1.9 km || 
|-id=414 bgcolor=#d6d6d6
| 568414 ||  || — || October 3, 2013 || Haleakala || Pan-STARRS ||  || align=right | 1.8 km || 
|-id=415 bgcolor=#d6d6d6
| 568415 ||  || — || September 12, 2007 || Mount Lemmon || Mount Lemmon Survey ||  || align=right | 1.9 km || 
|-id=416 bgcolor=#fefefe
| 568416 ||  || — || May 18, 2013 || Mount Lemmon || Mount Lemmon Survey ||  || align=right data-sort-value="0.53" | 530 m || 
|-id=417 bgcolor=#fefefe
| 568417 ||  || — || September 2, 2014 || Haleakala || Pan-STARRS ||  || align=right data-sort-value="0.72" | 720 m || 
|-id=418 bgcolor=#fefefe
| 568418 ||  || — || February 21, 2009 || Kitt Peak || Spacewatch ||  || align=right data-sort-value="0.63" | 630 m || 
|-id=419 bgcolor=#fefefe
| 568419 ||  || — || November 19, 2003 || Kitt Peak || Spacewatch ||  || align=right data-sort-value="0.77" | 770 m || 
|-id=420 bgcolor=#d6d6d6
| 568420 ||  || — || September 17, 2017 || Haleakala || Pan-STARRS ||  || align=right | 1.5 km || 
|-id=421 bgcolor=#E9E9E9
| 568421 ||  || — || October 23, 2017 || Mount Lemmon || Mount Lemmon Survey ||  || align=right | 1.9 km || 
|-id=422 bgcolor=#E9E9E9
| 568422 ||  || — || November 19, 2003 || Kitt Peak || Spacewatch ||  || align=right | 1.9 km || 
|-id=423 bgcolor=#fefefe
| 568423 ||  || — || March 11, 2005 || Kitt Peak || Spacewatch ||  || align=right data-sort-value="0.80" | 800 m || 
|-id=424 bgcolor=#d6d6d6
| 568424 ||  || — || November 21, 2003 || Kitt Peak || Spacewatch ||  || align=right | 2.8 km || 
|-id=425 bgcolor=#C2FFFF
| 568425 ||  || — || November 20, 2003 || Kitt Peak || Kitt Peak Obs. || L5 || align=right | 7.2 km || 
|-id=426 bgcolor=#E9E9E9
| 568426 ||  || — || December 1, 2003 || Kitt Peak || Spacewatch ||  || align=right | 1.6 km || 
|-id=427 bgcolor=#fefefe
| 568427 ||  || — || November 20, 2003 || Kitt Peak || Spacewatch ||  || align=right | 1.1 km || 
|-id=428 bgcolor=#E9E9E9
| 568428 ||  || — || December 3, 2003 || Socorro || LINEAR ||  || align=right | 1.2 km || 
|-id=429 bgcolor=#E9E9E9
| 568429 ||  || — || December 14, 2003 || Kitt Peak || Spacewatch ||  || align=right | 2.3 km || 
|-id=430 bgcolor=#d6d6d6
| 568430 ||  || — || February 17, 2010 || Mount Lemmon || Mount Lemmon Survey ||  || align=right | 2.4 km || 
|-id=431 bgcolor=#fefefe
| 568431 ||  || — || December 1, 2003 || Kitt Peak || Spacewatch || H || align=right data-sort-value="0.62" | 620 m || 
|-id=432 bgcolor=#E9E9E9
| 568432 ||  || — || October 21, 2003 || Kitt Peak || Spacewatch ||  || align=right | 2.0 km || 
|-id=433 bgcolor=#E9E9E9
| 568433 ||  || — || August 3, 2016 || Haleakala || Pan-STARRS ||  || align=right | 2.0 km || 
|-id=434 bgcolor=#fefefe
| 568434 ||  || — || August 22, 2014 || Haleakala || Pan-STARRS ||  || align=right data-sort-value="0.59" | 590 m || 
|-id=435 bgcolor=#fefefe
| 568435 ||  || — || November 21, 2003 || Socorro || LINEAR || H || align=right data-sort-value="0.62" | 620 m || 
|-id=436 bgcolor=#fefefe
| 568436 ||  || — || December 22, 2003 || Socorro || LINEAR || H || align=right data-sort-value="0.73" | 730 m || 
|-id=437 bgcolor=#E9E9E9
| 568437 ||  || — || December 17, 2003 || Kitt Peak || Spacewatch ||  || align=right | 1.3 km || 
|-id=438 bgcolor=#d6d6d6
| 568438 ||  || — || December 29, 2003 || Catalina || CSS ||  || align=right | 2.9 km || 
|-id=439 bgcolor=#fefefe
| 568439 ||  || — || December 18, 2003 || Kitt Peak || Spacewatch ||  || align=right data-sort-value="0.68" | 680 m || 
|-id=440 bgcolor=#E9E9E9
| 568440 ||  || — || May 24, 2006 || Kitt Peak || Spacewatch ||  || align=right | 1.9 km || 
|-id=441 bgcolor=#d6d6d6
| 568441 ||  || — || December 22, 2003 || Kitt Peak || Spacewatch ||  || align=right | 2.9 km || 
|-id=442 bgcolor=#d6d6d6
| 568442 ||  || — || October 21, 2008 || Kitt Peak || Spacewatch ||  || align=right | 2.6 km || 
|-id=443 bgcolor=#E9E9E9
| 568443 ||  || — || December 8, 2012 || Mount Lemmon || Mount Lemmon Survey ||  || align=right | 2.1 km || 
|-id=444 bgcolor=#fefefe
| 568444 ||  || — || November 18, 2014 || Haleakala || Pan-STARRS ||  || align=right data-sort-value="0.54" | 540 m || 
|-id=445 bgcolor=#C2FFFF
| 568445 ||  || — || September 28, 2013 || Mount Lemmon || Mount Lemmon Survey || L5 || align=right | 7.4 km || 
|-id=446 bgcolor=#E9E9E9
| 568446 ||  || — || June 15, 2015 || Haleakala || Pan-STARRS ||  || align=right | 2.0 km || 
|-id=447 bgcolor=#d6d6d6
| 568447 ||  || — || March 24, 2015 || Haleakala || Pan-STARRS ||  || align=right | 2.6 km || 
|-id=448 bgcolor=#d6d6d6
| 568448 ||  || — || October 24, 2017 || Mount Lemmon || Mount Lemmon Survey ||  || align=right | 2.0 km || 
|-id=449 bgcolor=#d6d6d6
| 568449 ||  || — || February 13, 2004 || Kitt Peak || Spacewatch ||  || align=right | 2.2 km || 
|-id=450 bgcolor=#d6d6d6
| 568450 ||  || — || February 11, 2004 || Palomar || NEAT ||  || align=right | 2.4 km || 
|-id=451 bgcolor=#E9E9E9
| 568451 ||  || — || December 29, 2003 || Kitt Peak || Spacewatch ||  || align=right | 1.1 km || 
|-id=452 bgcolor=#fefefe
| 568452 ||  || — || January 15, 2004 || Kitt Peak || Spacewatch ||  || align=right data-sort-value="0.68" | 680 m || 
|-id=453 bgcolor=#d6d6d6
| 568453 ||  || — || January 19, 2004 || Socorro || LINEAR ||  || align=right | 2.4 km || 
|-id=454 bgcolor=#fefefe
| 568454 ||  || — || January 16, 2004 || Palomar || NEAT || H || align=right data-sort-value="0.82" | 820 m || 
|-id=455 bgcolor=#fefefe
| 568455 ||  || — || January 22, 2004 || Socorro || LINEAR || H || align=right data-sort-value="0.65" | 650 m || 
|-id=456 bgcolor=#d6d6d6
| 568456 ||  || — || January 22, 2004 || Socorro || LINEAR ||  || align=right | 1.8 km || 
|-id=457 bgcolor=#fefefe
| 568457 ||  || — || January 19, 2004 || Kitt Peak || Spacewatch ||  || align=right data-sort-value="0.64" | 640 m || 
|-id=458 bgcolor=#d6d6d6
| 568458 ||  || — || January 19, 2004 || Kitt Peak || Spacewatch ||  || align=right | 2.0 km || 
|-id=459 bgcolor=#fefefe
| 568459 ||  || — || January 28, 2004 || Kitt Peak || Spacewatch ||  || align=right data-sort-value="0.71" | 710 m || 
|-id=460 bgcolor=#fefefe
| 568460 ||  || — || November 28, 2014 || Haleakala || Pan-STARRS ||  || align=right data-sort-value="0.85" | 850 m || 
|-id=461 bgcolor=#d6d6d6
| 568461 ||  || — || October 12, 2007 || Mount Lemmon || Mount Lemmon Survey ||  || align=right | 2.1 km || 
|-id=462 bgcolor=#fefefe
| 568462 ||  || — || January 28, 2004 || Kitt Peak || Spacewatch ||  || align=right data-sort-value="0.45" | 450 m || 
|-id=463 bgcolor=#d6d6d6
| 568463 ||  || — || July 4, 2016 || Haleakala || Pan-STARRS ||  || align=right | 1.7 km || 
|-id=464 bgcolor=#E9E9E9
| 568464 ||  || — || January 19, 2004 || Kitt Peak || Spacewatch ||  || align=right | 1.1 km || 
|-id=465 bgcolor=#E9E9E9
| 568465 ||  || — || January 30, 2004 || Kitt Peak || Spacewatch ||  || align=right | 1.1 km || 
|-id=466 bgcolor=#fefefe
| 568466 ||  || — || January 30, 2004 || Kitt Peak || Spacewatch || H || align=right data-sort-value="0.57" | 570 m || 
|-id=467 bgcolor=#d6d6d6
| 568467 ||  || — || January 22, 2004 || Socorro || LINEAR ||  || align=right | 2.5 km || 
|-id=468 bgcolor=#fefefe
| 568468 ||  || — || February 11, 2004 || Palomar || NEAT ||  || align=right data-sort-value="0.55" | 550 m || 
|-id=469 bgcolor=#fefefe
| 568469 ||  || — || February 11, 2004 || Palomar || NEAT || H || align=right data-sort-value="0.46" | 460 m || 
|-id=470 bgcolor=#E9E9E9
| 568470 ||  || — || August 29, 2006 || Kitt Peak || Spacewatch ||  || align=right | 1.7 km || 
|-id=471 bgcolor=#fefefe
| 568471 ||  || — || February 12, 2004 || Kitt Peak || Spacewatch ||  || align=right data-sort-value="0.64" | 640 m || 
|-id=472 bgcolor=#fefefe
| 568472 ||  || — || February 12, 2004 || Kitt Peak || Spacewatch ||  || align=right data-sort-value="0.78" | 780 m || 
|-id=473 bgcolor=#fefefe
| 568473 ||  || — || February 12, 2004 || Palomar || NEAT ||  || align=right | 1.0 km || 
|-id=474 bgcolor=#fefefe
| 568474 ||  || — || October 22, 2012 || Haleakala || Pan-STARRS ||  || align=right data-sort-value="0.64" | 640 m || 
|-id=475 bgcolor=#fefefe
| 568475 ||  || — || February 13, 2008 || Mount Lemmon || Mount Lemmon Survey ||  || align=right data-sort-value="0.62" | 620 m || 
|-id=476 bgcolor=#fefefe
| 568476 ||  || — || February 11, 2008 || Mount Lemmon || Mount Lemmon Survey ||  || align=right data-sort-value="0.63" | 630 m || 
|-id=477 bgcolor=#fefefe
| 568477 ||  || — || April 5, 2014 || Haleakala || Pan-STARRS ||  || align=right data-sort-value="0.57" | 570 m || 
|-id=478 bgcolor=#fefefe
| 568478 ||  || — || September 19, 2014 || Haleakala || Pan-STARRS ||  || align=right data-sort-value="0.54" | 540 m || 
|-id=479 bgcolor=#fefefe
| 568479 ||  || — || February 16, 2004 || Socorro || LINEAR || H || align=right data-sort-value="0.63" | 630 m || 
|-id=480 bgcolor=#C2FFFF
| 568480 ||  || — || February 26, 2004 || Kitt Peak || M. W. Buie, D. E. Trilling || L5 || align=right | 7.1 km || 
|-id=481 bgcolor=#d6d6d6
| 568481 ||  || — || February 17, 2004 || Kitt Peak || Spacewatch ||  || align=right | 1.8 km || 
|-id=482 bgcolor=#d6d6d6
| 568482 ||  || — || February 5, 2009 || Kitt Peak || Spacewatch ||  || align=right | 2.1 km || 
|-id=483 bgcolor=#d6d6d6
| 568483 ||  || — || July 13, 2016 || Mount Lemmon || Mount Lemmon Survey ||  || align=right | 2.2 km || 
|-id=484 bgcolor=#d6d6d6
| 568484 ||  || — || August 17, 2006 || Palomar || NEAT ||  || align=right | 2.6 km || 
|-id=485 bgcolor=#fefefe
| 568485 ||  || — || October 21, 2006 || Mount Lemmon || Mount Lemmon Survey ||  || align=right data-sort-value="0.79" | 790 m || 
|-id=486 bgcolor=#fefefe
| 568486 ||  || — || April 9, 2014 || Haleakala || Pan-STARRS ||  || align=right data-sort-value="0.69" | 690 m || 
|-id=487 bgcolor=#d6d6d6
| 568487 ||  || — || September 18, 2012 || Mount Lemmon || Mount Lemmon Survey ||  || align=right | 2.7 km || 
|-id=488 bgcolor=#fefefe
| 568488 ||  || — || January 9, 2016 || Haleakala || Pan-STARRS ||  || align=right | 1.0 km || 
|-id=489 bgcolor=#fefefe
| 568489 ||  || — || July 7, 2016 || Haleakala || Pan-STARRS ||  || align=right data-sort-value="0.68" | 680 m || 
|-id=490 bgcolor=#d6d6d6
| 568490 ||  || — || January 2, 2014 || Kitt Peak || Spacewatch ||  || align=right | 2.4 km || 
|-id=491 bgcolor=#d6d6d6
| 568491 ||  || — || January 20, 2009 || Kitt Peak || Spacewatch ||  || align=right | 2.2 km || 
|-id=492 bgcolor=#d6d6d6
| 568492 ||  || — || February 22, 2004 || Kitt Peak || M. W. Buie ||  || align=right | 2.5 km || 
|-id=493 bgcolor=#d6d6d6
| 568493 ||  || — || March 15, 2004 || Kitt Peak || Spacewatch ||  || align=right | 1.8 km || 
|-id=494 bgcolor=#d6d6d6
| 568494 ||  || — || March 15, 2004 || Kitt Peak || Spacewatch ||  || align=right | 2.1 km || 
|-id=495 bgcolor=#E9E9E9
| 568495 ||  || — || March 15, 2004 || Palomar || NEAT ||  || align=right | 1.4 km || 
|-id=496 bgcolor=#E9E9E9
| 568496 ||  || — || March 14, 2004 || Kitt Peak || Spacewatch ||  || align=right data-sort-value="0.77" | 770 m || 
|-id=497 bgcolor=#d6d6d6
| 568497 ||  || — || March 15, 2004 || Kitt Peak || Spacewatch ||  || align=right | 1.6 km || 
|-id=498 bgcolor=#d6d6d6
| 568498 ||  || — || March 15, 2004 || Kitt Peak || Spacewatch ||  || align=right | 2.2 km || 
|-id=499 bgcolor=#E9E9E9
| 568499 ||  || — || March 15, 2004 || Kitt Peak || Spacewatch ||  || align=right data-sort-value="0.77" | 770 m || 
|-id=500 bgcolor=#E9E9E9
| 568500 ||  || — || March 15, 2004 || Kitt Peak || Spacewatch ||  || align=right | 1.8 km || 
|}

568501–568600 

|-bgcolor=#d6d6d6
| 568501 ||  || — || March 15, 2004 || Kitt Peak || Spacewatch ||  || align=right | 2.1 km || 
|-id=502 bgcolor=#d6d6d6
| 568502 ||  || — || March 15, 2004 || Kitt Peak || Spacewatch ||  || align=right | 1.9 km || 
|-id=503 bgcolor=#d6d6d6
| 568503 ||  || — || October 17, 2007 || Mount Lemmon || Mount Lemmon Survey ||  || align=right | 2.4 km || 
|-id=504 bgcolor=#E9E9E9
| 568504 ||  || — || November 26, 2014 || Catalina || CSS ||  || align=right | 1.0 km || 
|-id=505 bgcolor=#fefefe
| 568505 ||  || — || January 12, 2011 || Mount Lemmon || Mount Lemmon Survey ||  || align=right data-sort-value="0.59" | 590 m || 
|-id=506 bgcolor=#d6d6d6
| 568506 ||  || — || November 8, 2007 || Mount Lemmon || Mount Lemmon Survey ||  || align=right | 2.3 km || 
|-id=507 bgcolor=#E9E9E9
| 568507 ||  || — || March 15, 2004 || Kitt Peak || Spacewatch ||  || align=right data-sort-value="0.69" | 690 m || 
|-id=508 bgcolor=#d6d6d6
| 568508 ||  || — || March 15, 2004 || Kitt Peak || Spacewatch || 3:2 || align=right | 3.2 km || 
|-id=509 bgcolor=#d6d6d6
| 568509 ||  || — || March 27, 2004 || Bergisch Gladbach || W. Bickel ||  || align=right | 2.3 km || 
|-id=510 bgcolor=#fefefe
| 568510 ||  || — || March 18, 2004 || Kitt Peak || Spacewatch ||  || align=right data-sort-value="0.54" | 540 m || 
|-id=511 bgcolor=#fefefe
| 568511 ||  || — || March 18, 2004 || Kitt Peak || Spacewatch ||  || align=right data-sort-value="0.78" | 780 m || 
|-id=512 bgcolor=#fefefe
| 568512 ||  || — || March 19, 2004 || Socorro || LINEAR || H || align=right data-sort-value="0.71" | 710 m || 
|-id=513 bgcolor=#d6d6d6
| 568513 ||  || — || March 16, 2004 || Kitt Peak || Spacewatch ||  || align=right | 1.7 km || 
|-id=514 bgcolor=#E9E9E9
| 568514 ||  || — || February 26, 2004 || Kitt Peak || M. W. Buie, D. E. Trilling ||  || align=right data-sort-value="0.98" | 980 m || 
|-id=515 bgcolor=#E9E9E9
| 568515 ||  || — || March 21, 2004 || Kitt Peak || Spacewatch ||  || align=right | 2.0 km || 
|-id=516 bgcolor=#d6d6d6
| 568516 ||  || — || March 21, 2004 || Kitt Peak || Spacewatch ||  || align=right | 2.9 km || 
|-id=517 bgcolor=#d6d6d6
| 568517 ||  || — || March 23, 2004 || Kitt Peak || Spacewatch ||  || align=right | 2.4 km || 
|-id=518 bgcolor=#E9E9E9
| 568518 ||  || — || March 26, 2004 || Kitt Peak || Spacewatch ||  || align=right data-sort-value="0.82" | 820 m || 
|-id=519 bgcolor=#d6d6d6
| 568519 ||  || — || March 23, 2004 || Kitt Peak || Spacewatch ||  || align=right | 2.9 km || 
|-id=520 bgcolor=#d6d6d6
| 568520 ||  || — || March 29, 2004 || Kitt Peak || Spacewatch ||  || align=right | 2.4 km || 
|-id=521 bgcolor=#d6d6d6
| 568521 ||  || — || March 29, 2004 || Kitt Peak || Spacewatch ||  || align=right | 2.1 km || 
|-id=522 bgcolor=#d6d6d6
| 568522 ||  || — || March 17, 2004 || Kitt Peak || Spacewatch ||  || align=right | 2.2 km || 
|-id=523 bgcolor=#d6d6d6
| 568523 ||  || — || March 17, 2004 || Kitt Peak || Spacewatch ||  || align=right | 2.3 km || 
|-id=524 bgcolor=#d6d6d6
| 568524 ||  || — || July 1, 2011 || Mount Lemmon || Mount Lemmon Survey ||  || align=right | 2.7 km || 
|-id=525 bgcolor=#d6d6d6
| 568525 ||  || — || March 2, 2009 || Mount Lemmon || Mount Lemmon Survey ||  || align=right | 2.5 km || 
|-id=526 bgcolor=#E9E9E9
| 568526 ||  || — || August 31, 2005 || Kitt Peak || Spacewatch ||  || align=right data-sort-value="0.98" | 980 m || 
|-id=527 bgcolor=#d6d6d6
| 568527 ||  || — || May 18, 2015 || Mount Lemmon || Mount Lemmon Survey ||  || align=right | 2.2 km || 
|-id=528 bgcolor=#d6d6d6
| 568528 ||  || — || January 20, 2009 || Mount Lemmon || Mount Lemmon Survey ||  || align=right | 3.4 km || 
|-id=529 bgcolor=#d6d6d6
| 568529 ||  || — || March 2, 2009 || Kitt Peak || Spacewatch ||  || align=right | 2.1 km || 
|-id=530 bgcolor=#E9E9E9
| 568530 ||  || — || March 13, 2012 || Mount Lemmon || Mount Lemmon Survey ||  || align=right data-sort-value="0.67" | 670 m || 
|-id=531 bgcolor=#E9E9E9
| 568531 ||  || — || March 21, 2009 || Kitt Peak || Spacewatch ||  || align=right | 1.6 km || 
|-id=532 bgcolor=#d6d6d6
| 568532 ||  || — || September 19, 2012 || Mount Lemmon || Mount Lemmon Survey ||  || align=right | 2.5 km || 
|-id=533 bgcolor=#d6d6d6
| 568533 ||  || — || October 11, 2007 || Kitt Peak || Spacewatch ||  || align=right | 2.7 km || 
|-id=534 bgcolor=#d6d6d6
| 568534 ||  || — || February 26, 2014 || Haleakala || Pan-STARRS ||  || align=right | 2.4 km || 
|-id=535 bgcolor=#fefefe
| 568535 ||  || — || January 27, 2011 || Mount Lemmon || Mount Lemmon Survey ||  || align=right data-sort-value="0.65" | 650 m || 
|-id=536 bgcolor=#d6d6d6
| 568536 ||  || — || September 19, 2012 || Mount Lemmon || Mount Lemmon Survey ||  || align=right | 2.4 km || 
|-id=537 bgcolor=#fefefe
| 568537 ||  || — || January 10, 2007 || Mount Lemmon || Mount Lemmon Survey ||  || align=right data-sort-value="0.62" | 620 m || 
|-id=538 bgcolor=#d6d6d6
| 568538 ||  || — || February 26, 2009 || Catalina || CSS ||  || align=right | 2.2 km || 
|-id=539 bgcolor=#d6d6d6
| 568539 ||  || — || October 12, 2007 || Kitt Peak || Spacewatch ||  || align=right | 2.3 km || 
|-id=540 bgcolor=#d6d6d6
| 568540 ||  || — || February 1, 2009 || Kitt Peak || Spacewatch ||  || align=right | 2.1 km || 
|-id=541 bgcolor=#d6d6d6
| 568541 ||  || — || February 10, 2014 || Haleakala || Pan-STARRS ||  || align=right | 2.1 km || 
|-id=542 bgcolor=#d6d6d6
| 568542 ||  || — || September 19, 2006 || Kitt Peak || Spacewatch ||  || align=right | 2.7 km || 
|-id=543 bgcolor=#d6d6d6
| 568543 ||  || — || April 23, 2015 || Kitt Peak || Spacewatch ||  || align=right | 2.4 km || 
|-id=544 bgcolor=#d6d6d6
| 568544 ||  || — || April 5, 2014 || Haleakala || Pan-STARRS ||  || align=right | 1.9 km || 
|-id=545 bgcolor=#E9E9E9
| 568545 ||  || — || December 8, 2015 || Mount Lemmon || Mount Lemmon Survey ||  || align=right data-sort-value="0.75" | 750 m || 
|-id=546 bgcolor=#d6d6d6
| 568546 ||  || — || February 9, 2016 || Kitt Peak || Spacewatch || 7:4 || align=right | 2.5 km || 
|-id=547 bgcolor=#fefefe
| 568547 ||  || — || December 21, 2006 || Kitt Peak || Spacewatch ||  || align=right data-sort-value="0.62" | 620 m || 
|-id=548 bgcolor=#d6d6d6
| 568548 ||  || — || August 2, 2011 || Haleakala || Pan-STARRS ||  || align=right | 2.1 km || 
|-id=549 bgcolor=#fefefe
| 568549 ||  || — || March 26, 2004 || Kitt Peak || Spacewatch || H || align=right data-sort-value="0.59" | 590 m || 
|-id=550 bgcolor=#fefefe
| 568550 ||  || — || April 12, 2004 || Kitt Peak || Spacewatch ||  || align=right data-sort-value="0.47" | 470 m || 
|-id=551 bgcolor=#d6d6d6
| 568551 ||  || — || April 9, 2004 || Siding Spring || SSS ||  || align=right | 2.6 km || 
|-id=552 bgcolor=#FA8072
| 568552 ||  || — || March 17, 2004 || Socorro || LINEAR ||  || align=right data-sort-value="0.86" | 860 m || 
|-id=553 bgcolor=#E9E9E9
| 568553 ||  || — || April 12, 2004 || Kitt Peak || Spacewatch ||  || align=right data-sort-value="0.74" | 740 m || 
|-id=554 bgcolor=#d6d6d6
| 568554 ||  || — || April 13, 2004 || Kitt Peak || Spacewatch ||  || align=right | 2.3 km || 
|-id=555 bgcolor=#fefefe
| 568555 ||  || — || April 13, 2004 || Kitt Peak || Spacewatch ||  || align=right data-sort-value="0.59" | 590 m || 
|-id=556 bgcolor=#fefefe
| 568556 ||  || — || April 13, 2004 || Palomar || NEAT ||  || align=right data-sort-value="0.82" | 820 m || 
|-id=557 bgcolor=#d6d6d6
| 568557 ||  || — || April 13, 2004 || Kitt Peak || Spacewatch ||  || align=right | 2.4 km || 
|-id=558 bgcolor=#E9E9E9
| 568558 ||  || — || April 13, 2004 || Kitt Peak || Spacewatch ||  || align=right data-sort-value="0.80" | 800 m || 
|-id=559 bgcolor=#fefefe
| 568559 ||  || — || January 10, 2007 || Kitt Peak || Spacewatch ||  || align=right data-sort-value="0.90" | 900 m || 
|-id=560 bgcolor=#d6d6d6
| 568560 ||  || — || February 23, 2015 || Haleakala || Pan-STARRS ||  || align=right | 3.4 km || 
|-id=561 bgcolor=#fefefe
| 568561 ||  || — || April 15, 2015 || Mount Lemmon || Mount Lemmon Survey || H || align=right data-sort-value="0.60" | 600 m || 
|-id=562 bgcolor=#E9E9E9
| 568562 ||  || — || October 29, 2011 || Kitt Peak || Spacewatch ||  || align=right | 1.9 km || 
|-id=563 bgcolor=#E9E9E9
| 568563 ||  || — || March 26, 2008 || Mount Lemmon || Mount Lemmon Survey ||  || align=right | 1.0 km || 
|-id=564 bgcolor=#fefefe
| 568564 ||  || — || July 25, 2001 || Haleakala || AMOS ||  || align=right data-sort-value="0.72" | 720 m || 
|-id=565 bgcolor=#d6d6d6
| 568565 ||  || — || April 20, 2004 || Socorro || LINEAR ||  || align=right | 3.3 km || 
|-id=566 bgcolor=#d6d6d6
| 568566 ||  || — || April 16, 2004 || Kitt Peak || Spacewatch ||  || align=right | 2.4 km || 
|-id=567 bgcolor=#E9E9E9
| 568567 ||  || — || March 29, 2004 || Kitt Peak || Spacewatch ||  || align=right | 1.4 km || 
|-id=568 bgcolor=#d6d6d6
| 568568 ||  || — || April 20, 2004 || Kitt Peak || Spacewatch ||  || align=right | 2.7 km || 
|-id=569 bgcolor=#d6d6d6
| 568569 ||  || — || April 24, 2004 || Kitt Peak || Spacewatch ||  || align=right | 2.7 km || 
|-id=570 bgcolor=#E9E9E9
| 568570 ||  || — || April 22, 2004 || Kitt Peak || Spacewatch ||  || align=right | 1.1 km || 
|-id=571 bgcolor=#d6d6d6
| 568571 ||  || — || April 22, 2004 || Kitt Peak || Spacewatch ||  || align=right | 2.7 km || 
|-id=572 bgcolor=#E9E9E9
| 568572 ||  || — || April 24, 2004 || Kitt Peak || Spacewatch ||  || align=right data-sort-value="0.68" | 680 m || 
|-id=573 bgcolor=#C2E0FF
| 568573 ||  || — || April 26, 2004 || Mauna Kea || J. J. Kavelaars || other TNOcritical || align=right | 170 km || 
|-id=574 bgcolor=#d6d6d6
| 568574 ||  || — || April 20, 2004 || Kitt Peak || Spacewatch ||  || align=right | 2.2 km || 
|-id=575 bgcolor=#d6d6d6
| 568575 ||  || — || April 16, 2004 || Kitt Peak || Spacewatch ||  || align=right | 2.2 km || 
|-id=576 bgcolor=#fefefe
| 568576 ||  || — || March 10, 2007 || Eskridge || G. Hug ||  || align=right data-sort-value="0.71" | 710 m || 
|-id=577 bgcolor=#E9E9E9
| 568577 ||  || — || April 19, 2004 || Kitt Peak || Spacewatch ||  || align=right | 2.1 km || 
|-id=578 bgcolor=#E9E9E9
| 568578 ||  || — || October 13, 2005 || Kitt Peak || Spacewatch ||  || align=right data-sort-value="0.81" | 810 m || 
|-id=579 bgcolor=#d6d6d6
| 568579 ||  || — || May 14, 2015 || Haleakala || Pan-STARRS ||  || align=right | 4.0 km || 
|-id=580 bgcolor=#E9E9E9
| 568580 ||  || — || March 10, 2008 || Mount Lemmon || Mount Lemmon Survey ||  || align=right data-sort-value="0.83" | 830 m || 
|-id=581 bgcolor=#d6d6d6
| 568581 ||  || — || February 27, 2009 || Kitt Peak || Spacewatch ||  || align=right | 2.3 km || 
|-id=582 bgcolor=#E9E9E9
| 568582 ||  || — || April 4, 2008 || Mount Lemmon || Mount Lemmon Survey ||  || align=right | 1.3 km || 
|-id=583 bgcolor=#fefefe
| 568583 ||  || — || April 19, 2004 || Kitt Peak || Spacewatch ||  || align=right data-sort-value="0.82" | 820 m || 
|-id=584 bgcolor=#d6d6d6
| 568584 ||  || — || December 8, 2012 || Mount Lemmon || Mount Lemmon Survey ||  || align=right | 2.7 km || 
|-id=585 bgcolor=#E9E9E9
| 568585 ||  || — || February 16, 2012 || Haleakala || Pan-STARRS ||  || align=right data-sort-value="0.68" | 680 m || 
|-id=586 bgcolor=#E9E9E9
| 568586 ||  || — || December 12, 2015 || Haleakala || Pan-STARRS ||  || align=right | 2.3 km || 
|-id=587 bgcolor=#fefefe
| 568587 ||  || — || October 21, 2015 || Haleakala || Pan-STARRS || H || align=right data-sort-value="0.65" | 650 m || 
|-id=588 bgcolor=#fefefe
| 568588 ||  || — || December 27, 2014 || Haleakala || Pan-STARRS ||  || align=right data-sort-value="0.70" | 700 m || 
|-id=589 bgcolor=#d6d6d6
| 568589 ||  || — || February 2, 2009 || Mount Lemmon || Mount Lemmon Survey ||  || align=right | 2.8 km || 
|-id=590 bgcolor=#d6d6d6
| 568590 ||  || — || April 20, 2004 || Siding Spring || SSS ||  || align=right | 3.2 km || 
|-id=591 bgcolor=#d6d6d6
| 568591 ||  || — || April 30, 2004 || Kitt Peak || Spacewatch ||  || align=right | 2.4 km || 
|-id=592 bgcolor=#d6d6d6
| 568592 ||  || — || May 14, 2004 || Kitt Peak || Spacewatch ||  || align=right | 2.2 km || 
|-id=593 bgcolor=#E9E9E9
| 568593 ||  || — || May 14, 2004 || Kitt Peak || Spacewatch ||  || align=right data-sort-value="0.81" | 810 m || 
|-id=594 bgcolor=#d6d6d6
| 568594 ||  || — || May 14, 2004 || Kitt Peak || Spacewatch ||  || align=right | 2.9 km || 
|-id=595 bgcolor=#E9E9E9
| 568595 ||  || — || May 14, 2004 || Socorro || LINEAR ||  || align=right | 1.6 km || 
|-id=596 bgcolor=#d6d6d6
| 568596 ||  || — || July 11, 2016 || Haleakala || Pan-STARRS ||  || align=right | 2.4 km || 
|-id=597 bgcolor=#d6d6d6
| 568597 ||  || — || October 21, 2007 || Mount Lemmon || Mount Lemmon Survey ||  || align=right | 2.3 km || 
|-id=598 bgcolor=#fefefe
| 568598 ||  || — || February 12, 2011 || Kitt Peak || Spacewatch ||  || align=right data-sort-value="0.78" | 780 m || 
|-id=599 bgcolor=#E9E9E9
| 568599 ||  || — || December 15, 2006 || Kitt Peak || Spacewatch ||  || align=right | 1.1 km || 
|-id=600 bgcolor=#d6d6d6
| 568600 ||  || — || February 25, 2014 || Kitt Peak || Spacewatch ||  || align=right | 2.3 km || 
|}

568601–568700 

|-bgcolor=#fefefe
| 568601 ||  || — || October 28, 2005 || Kitt Peak || Spacewatch ||  || align=right data-sort-value="0.58" | 580 m || 
|-id=602 bgcolor=#E9E9E9
| 568602 ||  || — || May 20, 2004 || Kitt Peak || Spacewatch ||  || align=right | 1.4 km || 
|-id=603 bgcolor=#d6d6d6
| 568603 ||  || — || May 21, 2004 || Campo Imperatore || CINEOS ||  || align=right | 3.2 km || 
|-id=604 bgcolor=#fefefe
| 568604 ||  || — || September 5, 2008 || Kitt Peak || Spacewatch ||  || align=right data-sort-value="0.60" | 600 m || 
|-id=605 bgcolor=#fefefe
| 568605 ||  || — || April 29, 2014 || Kitt Peak || Spacewatch ||  || align=right data-sort-value="0.71" | 710 m || 
|-id=606 bgcolor=#E9E9E9
| 568606 ||  || — || February 9, 2016 || Mount Lemmon || Mount Lemmon Survey ||  || align=right data-sort-value="0.79" | 790 m || 
|-id=607 bgcolor=#d6d6d6
| 568607 ||  || — || September 18, 2006 || Kitt Peak || Spacewatch ||  || align=right | 2.4 km || 
|-id=608 bgcolor=#d6d6d6
| 568608 ||  || — || April 1, 2014 || Mount Lemmon || Mount Lemmon Survey ||  || align=right | 2.8 km || 
|-id=609 bgcolor=#E9E9E9
| 568609 ||  || — || March 27, 2008 || Mount Lemmon || Mount Lemmon Survey ||  || align=right data-sort-value="0.80" | 800 m || 
|-id=610 bgcolor=#d6d6d6
| 568610 ||  || — || April 24, 2014 || Mount Lemmon || Mount Lemmon Survey ||  || align=right | 2.3 km || 
|-id=611 bgcolor=#fefefe
| 568611 ||  || — || June 11, 2004 || Kitt Peak || Spacewatch ||  || align=right data-sort-value="0.68" | 680 m || 
|-id=612 bgcolor=#E9E9E9
| 568612 ||  || — || June 12, 2004 || Kitt Peak || Spacewatch ||  || align=right data-sort-value="0.80" | 800 m || 
|-id=613 bgcolor=#E9E9E9
| 568613 ||  || — || June 13, 2004 || Kitt Peak || Spacewatch ||  || align=right data-sort-value="0.80" | 800 m || 
|-id=614 bgcolor=#E9E9E9
| 568614 ||  || — || June 14, 2004 || Kitt Peak || Spacewatch ||  || align=right | 1.2 km || 
|-id=615 bgcolor=#fefefe
| 568615 ||  || — || April 30, 2014 || Haleakala || Pan-STARRS ||  || align=right data-sort-value="0.62" | 620 m || 
|-id=616 bgcolor=#E9E9E9
| 568616 ||  || — || March 6, 2016 || Haleakala || Pan-STARRS ||  || align=right data-sort-value="0.81" | 810 m || 
|-id=617 bgcolor=#d6d6d6
| 568617 ||  || — || December 30, 2007 || Kitt Peak || Spacewatch ||  || align=right | 2.5 km || 
|-id=618 bgcolor=#d6d6d6
| 568618 ||  || — || December 11, 2012 || Mount Lemmon || Mount Lemmon Survey ||  || align=right | 2.5 km || 
|-id=619 bgcolor=#d6d6d6
| 568619 ||  || — || June 16, 2004 || Kitt Peak || Spacewatch ||  || align=right | 2.8 km || 
|-id=620 bgcolor=#d6d6d6
| 568620 ||  || — || May 28, 2004 || Kitt Peak || Spacewatch ||  || align=right | 1.8 km || 
|-id=621 bgcolor=#d6d6d6
| 568621 ||  || — || October 1, 1995 || Kitt Peak || Spacewatch ||  || align=right | 2.9 km || 
|-id=622 bgcolor=#E9E9E9
| 568622 ||  || — || November 27, 2013 || Haleakala || Pan-STARRS ||  || align=right data-sort-value="0.89" | 890 m || 
|-id=623 bgcolor=#E9E9E9
| 568623 ||  || — || April 11, 2016 || Haleakala || Pan-STARRS ||  || align=right data-sort-value="0.84" | 840 m || 
|-id=624 bgcolor=#E9E9E9
| 568624 ||  || — || July 15, 2004 || Cerro Tololo || Cerro Tololo Obs. ||  || align=right | 1.3 km || 
|-id=625 bgcolor=#d6d6d6
| 568625 ||  || — || July 15, 2004 || Siding Spring || R. H. McNaught ||  || align=right | 4.2 km || 
|-id=626 bgcolor=#fefefe
| 568626 ||  || — || July 16, 2004 || Socorro || LINEAR ||  || align=right data-sort-value="0.81" | 810 m || 
|-id=627 bgcolor=#E9E9E9
| 568627 ||  || — || July 16, 2004 || Socorro || LINEAR ||  || align=right | 1.6 km || 
|-id=628 bgcolor=#E9E9E9
| 568628 ||  || — || February 7, 2011 || Mount Lemmon || Mount Lemmon Survey ||  || align=right | 1.0 km || 
|-id=629 bgcolor=#d6d6d6
| 568629 ||  || — || February 8, 2013 || Haleakala || Pan-STARRS ||  || align=right | 2.6 km || 
|-id=630 bgcolor=#E9E9E9
| 568630 ||  || — || April 11, 2016 || Haleakala || Pan-STARRS ||  || align=right data-sort-value="0.93" | 930 m || 
|-id=631 bgcolor=#fefefe
| 568631 ||  || — || August 6, 2004 || Palomar || NEAT ||  || align=right data-sort-value="0.82" | 820 m || 
|-id=632 bgcolor=#E9E9E9
| 568632 ||  || — || August 7, 2004 || Great Shefford || P. Birtwhistle ||  || align=right | 1.5 km || 
|-id=633 bgcolor=#fefefe
| 568633 ||  || — || August 4, 2004 || Palomar || NEAT ||  || align=right | 1.0 km || 
|-id=634 bgcolor=#E9E9E9
| 568634 ||  || — || August 7, 2004 || Palomar || NEAT ||  || align=right | 1.5 km || 
|-id=635 bgcolor=#fefefe
| 568635 ||  || — || August 7, 2004 || Palomar || NEAT ||  || align=right data-sort-value="0.62" | 620 m || 
|-id=636 bgcolor=#E9E9E9
| 568636 ||  || — || August 7, 2004 || Palomar || NEAT ||  || align=right | 1.2 km || 
|-id=637 bgcolor=#E9E9E9
| 568637 ||  || — || August 7, 2004 || Palomar || NEAT || (1547) || align=right | 1.8 km || 
|-id=638 bgcolor=#d6d6d6
| 568638 ||  || — || August 9, 2004 || Socorro || LINEAR ||  || align=right | 3.4 km || 
|-id=639 bgcolor=#E9E9E9
| 568639 ||  || — || August 6, 2004 || Palomar || NEAT ||  || align=right | 1.1 km || 
|-id=640 bgcolor=#E9E9E9
| 568640 ||  || — || September 20, 2000 || Haleakala || AMOS ||  || align=right | 1.3 km || 
|-id=641 bgcolor=#fefefe
| 568641 ||  || — || August 7, 2004 || Palomar || NEAT ||  || align=right data-sort-value="0.67" | 670 m || 
|-id=642 bgcolor=#fefefe
| 568642 ||  || — || August 7, 2004 || Palomar || NEAT ||  || align=right data-sort-value="0.62" | 620 m || 
|-id=643 bgcolor=#E9E9E9
| 568643 ||  || — || December 9, 1996 || Kitt Peak || Spacewatch ||  || align=right | 1.5 km || 
|-id=644 bgcolor=#E9E9E9
| 568644 ||  || — || August 6, 2004 || Palomar || NEAT ||  || align=right | 1.1 km || 
|-id=645 bgcolor=#E9E9E9
| 568645 ||  || — || August 7, 2004 || Palomar || NEAT ||  || align=right | 1.3 km || 
|-id=646 bgcolor=#d6d6d6
| 568646 ||  || — || August 9, 2004 || Socorro || LINEAR ||  || align=right | 3.2 km || 
|-id=647 bgcolor=#d6d6d6
| 568647 ||  || — || February 21, 2002 || Kitt Peak || Spacewatch ||  || align=right | 3.3 km || 
|-id=648 bgcolor=#fefefe
| 568648 ||  || — || August 11, 2004 || Socorro || LINEAR ||  || align=right data-sort-value="0.94" | 940 m || 
|-id=649 bgcolor=#E9E9E9
| 568649 ||  || — || August 11, 2004 || Socorro || LINEAR ||  || align=right data-sort-value="0.98" | 980 m || 
|-id=650 bgcolor=#E9E9E9
| 568650 ||  || — || August 14, 2004 || Cerro Tololo || Cerro Tololo Obs. ||  || align=right | 1.3 km || 
|-id=651 bgcolor=#fefefe
| 568651 ||  || — || August 8, 2004 || Palomar || NEAT ||  || align=right data-sort-value="0.62" | 620 m || 
|-id=652 bgcolor=#E9E9E9
| 568652 ||  || — || August 12, 2004 || Mauna Kea || Mauna Kea Obs. ||  || align=right | 1.5 km || 
|-id=653 bgcolor=#E9E9E9
| 568653 ||  || — || August 7, 2004 || Palomar || NEAT ||  || align=right | 1.2 km || 
|-id=654 bgcolor=#E9E9E9
| 568654 ||  || — || December 25, 2005 || Mount Lemmon || Mount Lemmon Survey ||  || align=right | 1.6 km || 
|-id=655 bgcolor=#E9E9E9
| 568655 ||  || — || March 15, 2016 || Haleakala || Pan-STARRS ||  || align=right | 1.8 km || 
|-id=656 bgcolor=#d6d6d6
| 568656 ||  || — || August 15, 2004 || Cerro Tololo || Cerro Tololo Obs. ||  || align=right | 2.8 km || 
|-id=657 bgcolor=#E9E9E9
| 568657 ||  || — || August 15, 2004 || Cerro Tololo || Cerro Tololo Obs. ||  || align=right | 2.7 km || 
|-id=658 bgcolor=#E9E9E9
| 568658 ||  || — || August 19, 2004 || Reedy Creek || J. Broughton ||  || align=right | 1.1 km || 
|-id=659 bgcolor=#E9E9E9
| 568659 ||  || — || August 21, 2004 || Uppsala-Kvistaberg || Kvistaberg Obs. || MAR || align=right | 1.4 km || 
|-id=660 bgcolor=#d6d6d6
| 568660 ||  || — || August 22, 2004 || Mauna Kea || Mauna Kea Obs. ||  || align=right | 2.9 km || 
|-id=661 bgcolor=#d6d6d6
| 568661 ||  || — || February 9, 2002 || Kitt Peak || Spacewatch ||  || align=right | 2.4 km || 
|-id=662 bgcolor=#d6d6d6
| 568662 ||  || — || August 25, 2004 || Kitt Peak || Spacewatch ||  || align=right | 2.4 km || 
|-id=663 bgcolor=#fefefe
| 568663 ||  || — || July 29, 2008 || Mount Lemmon || Mount Lemmon Survey ||  || align=right data-sort-value="0.96" | 960 m || 
|-id=664 bgcolor=#d6d6d6
| 568664 ||  || — || May 1, 2014 || Mount Lemmon || Mount Lemmon Survey || Tj (2.99) || align=right | 3.5 km || 
|-id=665 bgcolor=#fefefe
| 568665 ||  || — || August 22, 2004 || Kitt Peak || Spacewatch ||  || align=right data-sort-value="0.82" | 820 m || 
|-id=666 bgcolor=#d6d6d6
| 568666 ||  || — || September 30, 2010 || Mount Lemmon || Mount Lemmon Survey ||  || align=right | 2.2 km || 
|-id=667 bgcolor=#E9E9E9
| 568667 ||  || — || October 3, 2013 || Catalina || CSS ||  || align=right | 1.3 km || 
|-id=668 bgcolor=#d6d6d6
| 568668 ||  || — || June 19, 2015 || Haleakala || Pan-STARRS ||  || align=right | 2.3 km || 
|-id=669 bgcolor=#E9E9E9
| 568669 ||  || — || April 15, 2012 || Haleakala || Pan-STARRS ||  || align=right | 1.3 km || 
|-id=670 bgcolor=#E9E9E9
| 568670 ||  || — || August 25, 2004 || Kitt Peak || Spacewatch ||  || align=right | 1.1 km || 
|-id=671 bgcolor=#E9E9E9
| 568671 ||  || — || November 10, 2013 || Mount Lemmon || Mount Lemmon Survey ||  || align=right | 1.2 km || 
|-id=672 bgcolor=#E9E9E9
| 568672 ||  || — || October 25, 2013 || Mount Lemmon || Mount Lemmon Survey ||  || align=right | 1.0 km || 
|-id=673 bgcolor=#d6d6d6
| 568673 ||  || — || February 3, 2013 || Haleakala || Pan-STARRS ||  || align=right | 2.8 km || 
|-id=674 bgcolor=#fefefe
| 568674 ||  || — || October 20, 2011 || Mount Lemmon || Mount Lemmon Survey ||  || align=right data-sort-value="0.62" | 620 m || 
|-id=675 bgcolor=#E9E9E9
| 568675 ||  || — || April 25, 2016 || Haleakala || Pan-STARRS ||  || align=right | 1.6 km || 
|-id=676 bgcolor=#fefefe
| 568676 ||  || — || December 25, 2005 || Kitt Peak || Spacewatch ||  || align=right data-sort-value="0.76" | 760 m || 
|-id=677 bgcolor=#d6d6d6
| 568677 ||  || — || August 25, 2004 || Kitt Peak || Spacewatch ||  || align=right | 3.2 km || 
|-id=678 bgcolor=#E9E9E9
| 568678 ||  || — || January 7, 2006 || Kitt Peak || Spacewatch ||  || align=right | 1.5 km || 
|-id=679 bgcolor=#d6d6d6
| 568679 ||  || — || November 25, 2005 || Kitt Peak || Spacewatch ||  || align=right | 2.7 km || 
|-id=680 bgcolor=#E9E9E9
| 568680 ||  || — || August 22, 2004 || Kitt Peak || Spacewatch ||  || align=right | 1.4 km || 
|-id=681 bgcolor=#E9E9E9
| 568681 ||  || — || August 22, 2004 || Kitt Peak || Spacewatch ||  || align=right | 1.7 km || 
|-id=682 bgcolor=#d6d6d6
| 568682 ||  || — || March 11, 2008 || Mount Lemmon || Mount Lemmon Survey ||  || align=right | 2.2 km || 
|-id=683 bgcolor=#d6d6d6
| 568683 ||  || — || March 17, 2013 || Mount Lemmon || Mount Lemmon Survey ||  || align=right | 2.4 km || 
|-id=684 bgcolor=#E9E9E9
| 568684 ||  || — || September 19, 2017 || Kitt Peak || Spacewatch ||  || align=right | 1.1 km || 
|-id=685 bgcolor=#d6d6d6
| 568685 ||  || — || September 4, 2004 || Palomar || NEAT ||  || align=right | 3.2 km || 
|-id=686 bgcolor=#fefefe
| 568686 ||  || — || September 7, 2004 || Kitt Peak || Spacewatch ||  || align=right data-sort-value="0.78" | 780 m || 
|-id=687 bgcolor=#E9E9E9
| 568687 ||  || — || September 7, 2004 || Kitt Peak || Spacewatch ||  || align=right | 1.2 km || 
|-id=688 bgcolor=#E9E9E9
| 568688 ||  || — || September 7, 2004 || Kitt Peak || Spacewatch ||  || align=right | 1.3 km || 
|-id=689 bgcolor=#E9E9E9
| 568689 ||  || — || August 8, 2004 || Palomar || NEAT ||  || align=right | 1.4 km || 
|-id=690 bgcolor=#fefefe
| 568690 ||  || — || September 8, 2004 || Socorro || LINEAR ||  || align=right data-sort-value="0.64" | 640 m || 
|-id=691 bgcolor=#fefefe
| 568691 ||  || — || September 8, 2004 || Socorro || LINEAR ||  || align=right data-sort-value="0.70" | 700 m || 
|-id=692 bgcolor=#fefefe
| 568692 ||  || — || September 7, 2004 || Palomar || NEAT ||  || align=right data-sort-value="0.86" | 860 m || 
|-id=693 bgcolor=#E9E9E9
| 568693 ||  || — || September 8, 2004 || Socorro || LINEAR ||  || align=right | 1.3 km || 
|-id=694 bgcolor=#E9E9E9
| 568694 ||  || — || August 13, 2004 || Palomar || NEAT ||  || align=right | 1.7 km || 
|-id=695 bgcolor=#E9E9E9
| 568695 ||  || — || September 8, 2004 || Socorro || LINEAR ||  || align=right | 1.7 km || 
|-id=696 bgcolor=#E9E9E9
| 568696 ||  || — || September 8, 2004 || Palomar || NEAT ||  || align=right | 2.0 km || 
|-id=697 bgcolor=#fefefe
| 568697 ||  || — || September 8, 2004 || Palomar || NEAT ||  || align=right data-sort-value="0.90" | 900 m || 
|-id=698 bgcolor=#FA8072
| 568698 ||  || — || September 8, 2004 || Palomar || NEAT ||  || align=right data-sort-value="0.69" | 690 m || 
|-id=699 bgcolor=#d6d6d6
| 568699 ||  || — || August 25, 2004 || Kitt Peak || Spacewatch ||  || align=right | 3.0 km || 
|-id=700 bgcolor=#d6d6d6
| 568700 ||  || — || September 7, 2004 || Kitt Peak || Spacewatch ||  || align=right | 3.4 km || 
|}

568701–568800 

|-bgcolor=#E9E9E9
| 568701 ||  || — || September 7, 2004 || Palomar || NEAT ||  || align=right | 1.4 km || 
|-id=702 bgcolor=#E9E9E9
| 568702 ||  || — || September 7, 2004 || Palomar || NEAT ||  || align=right | 1.6 km || 
|-id=703 bgcolor=#E9E9E9
| 568703 ||  || — || September 7, 2004 || Kitt Peak || Spacewatch ||  || align=right | 1.1 km || 
|-id=704 bgcolor=#E9E9E9
| 568704 ||  || — || September 7, 2004 || Kitt Peak || Spacewatch ||  || align=right | 1.4 km || 
|-id=705 bgcolor=#E9E9E9
| 568705 ||  || — || August 15, 2004 || Cerro Tololo || Cerro Tololo Obs. ||  || align=right | 1.2 km || 
|-id=706 bgcolor=#fefefe
| 568706 ||  || — || September 8, 2004 || Campo Imperatore || D. Perna, A. Giunta ||  || align=right data-sort-value="0.75" | 750 m || 
|-id=707 bgcolor=#fefefe
| 568707 ||  || — || September 8, 2004 || Socorro || LINEAR ||  || align=right data-sort-value="0.66" | 660 m || 
|-id=708 bgcolor=#fefefe
| 568708 ||  || — || September 10, 2004 || Socorro || LINEAR ||  || align=right data-sort-value="0.75" | 750 m || 
|-id=709 bgcolor=#E9E9E9
| 568709 ||  || — || September 10, 2004 || Socorro || LINEAR ||  || align=right | 1.3 km || 
|-id=710 bgcolor=#E9E9E9
| 568710 ||  || — || September 11, 2004 || Kitt Peak || Spacewatch ||  || align=right | 1.4 km || 
|-id=711 bgcolor=#E9E9E9
| 568711 ||  || — || September 11, 2004 || Socorro || LINEAR ||  || align=right | 1.6 km || 
|-id=712 bgcolor=#E9E9E9
| 568712 ||  || — || September 11, 2004 || Socorro || LINEAR ||  || align=right | 1.7 km || 
|-id=713 bgcolor=#E9E9E9
| 568713 ||  || — || September 11, 2004 || Socorro || LINEAR ||  || align=right | 1.4 km || 
|-id=714 bgcolor=#E9E9E9
| 568714 ||  || — || September 11, 2004 || Socorro || LINEAR ||  || align=right | 2.5 km || 
|-id=715 bgcolor=#E9E9E9
| 568715 ||  || — || September 10, 2004 || Kitt Peak || Spacewatch ||  || align=right | 1.7 km || 
|-id=716 bgcolor=#fefefe
| 568716 ||  || — || September 10, 2004 || Kitt Peak || Spacewatch ||  || align=right data-sort-value="0.69" | 690 m || 
|-id=717 bgcolor=#E9E9E9
| 568717 ||  || — || September 10, 2004 || Kitt Peak || Spacewatch ||  || align=right | 1.6 km || 
|-id=718 bgcolor=#E9E9E9
| 568718 ||  || — || September 10, 2004 || Kitt Peak || Spacewatch ||  || align=right | 1.1 km || 
|-id=719 bgcolor=#E9E9E9
| 568719 ||  || — || September 10, 2004 || Kitt Peak || Spacewatch ||  || align=right | 1.2 km || 
|-id=720 bgcolor=#d6d6d6
| 568720 ||  || — || September 10, 2004 || Kitt Peak || Spacewatch ||  || align=right | 4.0 km || 
|-id=721 bgcolor=#fefefe
| 568721 ||  || — || September 10, 2004 || Kitt Peak || Spacewatch ||  || align=right data-sort-value="0.65" | 650 m || 
|-id=722 bgcolor=#E9E9E9
| 568722 ||  || — || September 15, 2004 || Three Buttes || G. R. Jones ||  || align=right | 1.8 km || 
|-id=723 bgcolor=#d6d6d6
| 568723 ||  || — || September 10, 2004 || Kitt Peak || Spacewatch ||  || align=right | 2.5 km || 
|-id=724 bgcolor=#E9E9E9
| 568724 ||  || — || September 10, 2004 || Kitt Peak || Spacewatch ||  || align=right | 1.7 km || 
|-id=725 bgcolor=#E9E9E9
| 568725 ||  || — || September 10, 2004 || Kitt Peak || Spacewatch ||  || align=right | 1.1 km || 
|-id=726 bgcolor=#E9E9E9
| 568726 ||  || — || September 11, 2004 || Kitt Peak || Spacewatch ||  || align=right | 1.6 km || 
|-id=727 bgcolor=#E9E9E9
| 568727 ||  || — || September 11, 2004 || Kitt Peak || Spacewatch ||  || align=right | 1.6 km || 
|-id=728 bgcolor=#E9E9E9
| 568728 ||  || — || September 11, 2004 || Kitt Peak || Spacewatch ||  || align=right | 1.7 km || 
|-id=729 bgcolor=#E9E9E9
| 568729 ||  || — || September 11, 2004 || Kitt Peak || Spacewatch ||  || align=right | 1.7 km || 
|-id=730 bgcolor=#E9E9E9
| 568730 ||  || — || September 12, 2004 || Kitt Peak || Spacewatch ||  || align=right | 1.0 km || 
|-id=731 bgcolor=#d6d6d6
| 568731 ||  || — || September 13, 2004 || Kitt Peak || Spacewatch ||  || align=right | 2.4 km || 
|-id=732 bgcolor=#E9E9E9
| 568732 ||  || — || September 15, 2004 || Kitt Peak || Spacewatch ||  || align=right | 1.3 km || 
|-id=733 bgcolor=#E9E9E9
| 568733 ||  || — || September 11, 2004 || Kitt Peak || Spacewatch ||  || align=right | 1.2 km || 
|-id=734 bgcolor=#E9E9E9
| 568734 ||  || — || September 12, 2004 || Kitt Peak || Spacewatch ||  || align=right | 1.7 km || 
|-id=735 bgcolor=#fefefe
| 568735 ||  || — || September 9, 2004 || Socorro || LINEAR ||  || align=right data-sort-value="0.67" | 670 m || 
|-id=736 bgcolor=#E9E9E9
| 568736 ||  || — || September 13, 2004 || Socorro || LINEAR ||  || align=right | 1.4 km || 
|-id=737 bgcolor=#fefefe
| 568737 ||  || — || September 13, 2004 || Kitt Peak || Spacewatch ||  || align=right data-sort-value="0.65" | 650 m || 
|-id=738 bgcolor=#E9E9E9
| 568738 ||  || — || September 15, 2004 || Kitt Peak || Spacewatch ||  || align=right | 1.2 km || 
|-id=739 bgcolor=#E9E9E9
| 568739 ||  || — || September 15, 2004 || Kitt Peak || Spacewatch ||  || align=right | 1.5 km || 
|-id=740 bgcolor=#E9E9E9
| 568740 ||  || — || September 14, 2004 || Palomar || NEAT ||  || align=right | 2.4 km || 
|-id=741 bgcolor=#fefefe
| 568741 ||  || — || September 15, 2004 || Kitt Peak || Spacewatch ||  || align=right data-sort-value="0.49" | 490 m || 
|-id=742 bgcolor=#d6d6d6
| 568742 ||  || — || September 4, 2010 || Kitt Peak || Spacewatch ||  || align=right | 2.8 km || 
|-id=743 bgcolor=#E9E9E9
| 568743 ||  || — || November 21, 2009 || Mount Lemmon || Mount Lemmon Survey ||  || align=right | 1.4 km || 
|-id=744 bgcolor=#E9E9E9
| 568744 ||  || — || October 23, 2009 || Kitt Peak || Spacewatch ||  || align=right | 1.7 km || 
|-id=745 bgcolor=#d6d6d6
| 568745 ||  || — || April 15, 2007 || Mount Lemmon || Mount Lemmon Survey ||  || align=right | 2.4 km || 
|-id=746 bgcolor=#E9E9E9
| 568746 ||  || — || January 23, 2015 || Haleakala || Pan-STARRS ||  || align=right | 1.5 km || 
|-id=747 bgcolor=#d6d6d6
| 568747 ||  || — || September 7, 2004 || Kitt Peak || Spacewatch ||  || align=right | 2.5 km || 
|-id=748 bgcolor=#d6d6d6
| 568748 ||  || — || September 12, 2004 || Kitt Peak || Spacewatch ||  || align=right | 3.1 km || 
|-id=749 bgcolor=#E9E9E9
| 568749 ||  || — || September 6, 2008 || Mount Lemmon || Mount Lemmon Survey ||  || align=right | 1.5 km || 
|-id=750 bgcolor=#E9E9E9
| 568750 ||  || — || November 6, 2013 || Haleakala || Pan-STARRS ||  || align=right | 1.3 km || 
|-id=751 bgcolor=#FA8072
| 568751 ||  || — || October 7, 2004 || Anderson Mesa || LONEOS ||  || align=right data-sort-value="0.65" | 650 m || 
|-id=752 bgcolor=#fefefe
| 568752 ||  || — || December 31, 2008 || Mount Lemmon || Mount Lemmon Survey ||  || align=right data-sort-value="0.65" | 650 m || 
|-id=753 bgcolor=#E9E9E9
| 568753 ||  || — || October 5, 2013 || Haleakala || Pan-STARRS ||  || align=right | 1.1 km || 
|-id=754 bgcolor=#E9E9E9
| 568754 ||  || — || August 13, 2004 || Cerro Tololo || Cerro Tololo Obs. ||  || align=right | 1.1 km || 
|-id=755 bgcolor=#d6d6d6
| 568755 ||  || — || February 15, 2013 || Haleakala || Pan-STARRS ||  || align=right | 2.5 km || 
|-id=756 bgcolor=#d6d6d6
| 568756 ||  || — || September 12, 2004 || Kitt Peak || Spacewatch ||  || align=right | 2.9 km || 
|-id=757 bgcolor=#d6d6d6
| 568757 ||  || — || September 11, 2004 || Kitt Peak || Spacewatch ||  || align=right | 1.9 km || 
|-id=758 bgcolor=#E9E9E9
| 568758 ||  || — || August 23, 2004 || Anderson Mesa || LONEOS ||  || align=right data-sort-value="0.81" | 810 m || 
|-id=759 bgcolor=#fefefe
| 568759 ||  || — || September 21, 2004 || Kitt Peak || Spacewatch ||  || align=right data-sort-value="0.71" | 710 m || 
|-id=760 bgcolor=#E9E9E9
| 568760 ||  || — || September 21, 2004 || Kitt Peak || Spacewatch ||  || align=right | 1.4 km || 
|-id=761 bgcolor=#d6d6d6
| 568761 ||  || — || September 16, 2004 || Kitt Peak || Spacewatch ||  || align=right | 2.4 km || 
|-id=762 bgcolor=#fefefe
| 568762 ||  || — || September 18, 2004 || Socorro || LINEAR ||  || align=right data-sort-value="0.62" | 620 m || 
|-id=763 bgcolor=#E9E9E9
| 568763 ||  || — || September 16, 2004 || Kitt Peak || Spacewatch ||  || align=right | 1.4 km || 
|-id=764 bgcolor=#E9E9E9
| 568764 ||  || — || September 22, 2004 || Kitt Peak || Spacewatch ||  || align=right | 1.4 km || 
|-id=765 bgcolor=#d6d6d6
| 568765 ||  || — || April 9, 2014 || Haleakala || Pan-STARRS ||  || align=right | 2.4 km || 
|-id=766 bgcolor=#d6d6d6
| 568766 ||  || — || March 13, 2013 || Kitt Peak || Spacewatch ||  || align=right | 2.2 km || 
|-id=767 bgcolor=#E9E9E9
| 568767 ||  || — || March 4, 2016 || Haleakala || Pan-STARRS ||  || align=right | 1.2 km || 
|-id=768 bgcolor=#E9E9E9
| 568768 ||  || — || September 17, 2004 || Kitt Peak || Spacewatch ||  || align=right | 1.4 km || 
|-id=769 bgcolor=#d6d6d6
| 568769 ||  || — || October 5, 2004 || Kitt Peak || Spacewatch ||  || align=right | 2.5 km || 
|-id=770 bgcolor=#fefefe
| 568770 ||  || — || October 4, 2004 || Kitt Peak || Spacewatch ||  || align=right data-sort-value="0.57" | 570 m || 
|-id=771 bgcolor=#d6d6d6
| 568771 ||  || — || October 4, 2004 || Kitt Peak || Spacewatch ||  || align=right | 2.5 km || 
|-id=772 bgcolor=#E9E9E9
| 568772 ||  || — || October 4, 2004 || Kitt Peak || Spacewatch ||  || align=right | 1.2 km || 
|-id=773 bgcolor=#E9E9E9
| 568773 ||  || — || October 4, 2004 || Kitt Peak || Spacewatch ||  || align=right | 1.4 km || 
|-id=774 bgcolor=#E9E9E9
| 568774 ||  || — || October 4, 2004 || Kitt Peak || Spacewatch ||  || align=right | 2.2 km || 
|-id=775 bgcolor=#E9E9E9
| 568775 ||  || — || October 5, 2004 || Kitt Peak || Spacewatch ||  || align=right | 1.1 km || 
|-id=776 bgcolor=#fefefe
| 568776 ||  || — || October 5, 2004 || Kitt Peak || Spacewatch ||  || align=right data-sort-value="0.78" | 780 m || 
|-id=777 bgcolor=#E9E9E9
| 568777 ||  || — || October 5, 2004 || Kitt Peak || Spacewatch ||  || align=right | 1.2 km || 
|-id=778 bgcolor=#d6d6d6
| 568778 ||  || — || September 17, 2004 || Kitt Peak || Spacewatch ||  || align=right | 3.1 km || 
|-id=779 bgcolor=#E9E9E9
| 568779 ||  || — || October 5, 2004 || Kitt Peak || Spacewatch ||  || align=right | 2.1 km || 
|-id=780 bgcolor=#fefefe
| 568780 ||  || — || October 5, 2004 || Kitt Peak || Spacewatch ||  || align=right data-sort-value="0.74" | 740 m || 
|-id=781 bgcolor=#E9E9E9
| 568781 ||  || — || October 5, 2004 || Kitt Peak || Spacewatch ||  || align=right | 1.2 km || 
|-id=782 bgcolor=#E9E9E9
| 568782 ||  || — || October 8, 2004 || Socorro || LINEAR ||  || align=right | 2.2 km || 
|-id=783 bgcolor=#d6d6d6
| 568783 ||  || — || October 8, 2004 || Socorro || LINEAR ||  || align=right | 4.6 km || 
|-id=784 bgcolor=#d6d6d6
| 568784 ||  || — || October 8, 2004 || Anderson Mesa || LONEOS || LIX || align=right | 4.5 km || 
|-id=785 bgcolor=#E9E9E9
| 568785 ||  || — || October 8, 2004 || Kitt Peak || Spacewatch ||  || align=right | 1.4 km || 
|-id=786 bgcolor=#E9E9E9
| 568786 ||  || — || October 7, 2004 || Anderson Mesa || LONEOS ||  || align=right | 1.6 km || 
|-id=787 bgcolor=#E9E9E9
| 568787 ||  || — || September 8, 2004 || Palomar || NEAT ||  || align=right | 2.1 km || 
|-id=788 bgcolor=#E9E9E9
| 568788 ||  || — || October 5, 2004 || Kitt Peak || Spacewatch ||  || align=right | 1.3 km || 
|-id=789 bgcolor=#d6d6d6
| 568789 ||  || — || October 6, 2004 || Kitt Peak || Spacewatch ||  || align=right | 2.6 km || 
|-id=790 bgcolor=#d6d6d6
| 568790 ||  || — || September 15, 2004 || Kitt Peak || Spacewatch ||  || align=right | 2.8 km || 
|-id=791 bgcolor=#E9E9E9
| 568791 ||  || — || October 6, 2004 || Kitt Peak || Spacewatch ||  || align=right | 1.8 km || 
|-id=792 bgcolor=#E9E9E9
| 568792 ||  || — || October 6, 2004 || Kitt Peak || Spacewatch ||  || align=right | 2.6 km || 
|-id=793 bgcolor=#E9E9E9
| 568793 ||  || — || October 6, 2004 || Kitt Peak || Spacewatch ||  || align=right | 1.7 km || 
|-id=794 bgcolor=#E9E9E9
| 568794 ||  || — || October 7, 2004 || Kitt Peak || Spacewatch ||  || align=right | 1.2 km || 
|-id=795 bgcolor=#fefefe
| 568795 ||  || — || October 7, 2004 || Kitt Peak || Spacewatch || H || align=right data-sort-value="0.71" | 710 m || 
|-id=796 bgcolor=#d6d6d6
| 568796 ||  || — || October 7, 2004 || Kitt Peak || Spacewatch ||  || align=right | 2.7 km || 
|-id=797 bgcolor=#E9E9E9
| 568797 ||  || — || October 7, 2004 || Kitt Peak || Spacewatch ||  || align=right | 1.5 km || 
|-id=798 bgcolor=#fefefe
| 568798 ||  || — || October 7, 2004 || Kitt Peak || Spacewatch ||  || align=right data-sort-value="0.65" | 650 m || 
|-id=799 bgcolor=#E9E9E9
| 568799 ||  || — || October 7, 2004 || Kitt Peak || Spacewatch ||  || align=right | 1.3 km || 
|-id=800 bgcolor=#E9E9E9
| 568800 ||  || — || October 7, 2004 || Kitt Peak || Spacewatch ||  || align=right | 1.3 km || 
|}

568801–568900 

|-bgcolor=#fefefe
| 568801 ||  || — || October 7, 2004 || Kitt Peak || Spacewatch ||  || align=right data-sort-value="0.56" | 560 m || 
|-id=802 bgcolor=#E9E9E9
| 568802 ||  || — || October 7, 2004 || Kitt Peak || Spacewatch ||  || align=right | 1.8 km || 
|-id=803 bgcolor=#E9E9E9
| 568803 ||  || — || October 7, 2004 || Kitt Peak || Spacewatch ||  || align=right | 2.0 km || 
|-id=804 bgcolor=#fefefe
| 568804 ||  || — || October 7, 2004 || Kitt Peak || Spacewatch ||  || align=right data-sort-value="0.68" | 680 m || 
|-id=805 bgcolor=#d6d6d6
| 568805 ||  || — || October 8, 2004 || Kitt Peak || Spacewatch ||  || align=right | 2.7 km || 
|-id=806 bgcolor=#E9E9E9
| 568806 ||  || — || October 10, 2004 || Kitt Peak || Spacewatch ||  || align=right | 1.3 km || 
|-id=807 bgcolor=#fefefe
| 568807 ||  || — || October 5, 2004 || Kitt Peak || Spacewatch ||  || align=right data-sort-value="0.65" | 650 m || 
|-id=808 bgcolor=#d6d6d6
| 568808 ||  || — || October 7, 2004 || Palomar || NEAT ||  || align=right | 3.4 km || 
|-id=809 bgcolor=#E9E9E9
| 568809 ||  || — || October 7, 2004 || Palomar || NEAT ||  || align=right | 3.2 km || 
|-id=810 bgcolor=#E9E9E9
| 568810 ||  || — || October 8, 2004 || Kitt Peak || Spacewatch ||  || align=right | 2.2 km || 
|-id=811 bgcolor=#fefefe
| 568811 ||  || — || October 8, 2004 || Kitt Peak || Spacewatch ||  || align=right data-sort-value="0.60" | 600 m || 
|-id=812 bgcolor=#E9E9E9
| 568812 ||  || — || October 8, 2004 || Kitt Peak || Spacewatch ||  || align=right | 1.4 km || 
|-id=813 bgcolor=#E9E9E9
| 568813 ||  || — || September 17, 1995 || Kitt Peak || Spacewatch ||  || align=right | 1.1 km || 
|-id=814 bgcolor=#E9E9E9
| 568814 ||  || — || September 22, 2004 || Kitt Peak || Spacewatch ||  || align=right | 1.4 km || 
|-id=815 bgcolor=#E9E9E9
| 568815 ||  || — || October 8, 2004 || Anderson Mesa || LONEOS ||  || align=right | 1.7 km || 
|-id=816 bgcolor=#E9E9E9
| 568816 ||  || — || October 8, 2004 || Kitt Peak || Spacewatch ||  || align=right | 1.4 km || 
|-id=817 bgcolor=#fefefe
| 568817 ||  || — || October 9, 2004 || Kitt Peak || Spacewatch ||  || align=right data-sort-value="0.59" | 590 m || 
|-id=818 bgcolor=#E9E9E9
| 568818 ||  || — || September 24, 2004 || Kitt Peak || Spacewatch ||  || align=right | 1.2 km || 
|-id=819 bgcolor=#d6d6d6
| 568819 ||  || — || October 7, 2004 || Kitt Peak || Spacewatch ||  || align=right | 2.4 km || 
|-id=820 bgcolor=#E9E9E9
| 568820 ||  || — || October 9, 2004 || Kitt Peak || Spacewatch ||  || align=right | 1.1 km || 
|-id=821 bgcolor=#E9E9E9
| 568821 ||  || — || October 9, 2004 || Kitt Peak || Spacewatch ||  || align=right | 2.0 km || 
|-id=822 bgcolor=#d6d6d6
| 568822 ||  || — || October 8, 2004 || Kitt Peak || Spacewatch ||  || align=right | 2.3 km || 
|-id=823 bgcolor=#E9E9E9
| 568823 ||  || — || October 10, 2004 || Kitt Peak || Spacewatch ||  || align=right | 1.5 km || 
|-id=824 bgcolor=#fefefe
| 568824 ||  || — || October 10, 2004 || Socorro || LINEAR ||  || align=right data-sort-value="0.94" | 940 m || 
|-id=825 bgcolor=#E9E9E9
| 568825 ||  || — || September 23, 2004 || Kitt Peak || Spacewatch ||  || align=right | 1.3 km || 
|-id=826 bgcolor=#E9E9E9
| 568826 ||  || — || October 11, 2004 || Kitt Peak || Spacewatch ||  || align=right | 1.2 km || 
|-id=827 bgcolor=#E9E9E9
| 568827 ||  || — || October 12, 2004 || Socorro || LINEAR ||  || align=right | 1.7 km || 
|-id=828 bgcolor=#d6d6d6
| 568828 ||  || — || October 14, 2004 || Palomar || NEAT ||  || align=right | 2.7 km || 
|-id=829 bgcolor=#fefefe
| 568829 ||  || — || October 14, 2004 || Palomar || NEAT ||  || align=right data-sort-value="0.82" | 820 m || 
|-id=830 bgcolor=#d6d6d6
| 568830 ||  || — || October 8, 2004 || Kitt Peak || Spacewatch ||  || align=right | 2.5 km || 
|-id=831 bgcolor=#E9E9E9
| 568831 ||  || — || October 10, 2004 || Kitt Peak || Spacewatch ||  || align=right | 2.3 km || 
|-id=832 bgcolor=#E9E9E9
| 568832 ||  || — || October 15, 2004 || Socorro || LINEAR ||  || align=right | 1.2 km || 
|-id=833 bgcolor=#d6d6d6
| 568833 ||  || — || October 15, 2004 || Kitt Peak || Spacewatch ||  || align=right | 3.0 km || 
|-id=834 bgcolor=#E9E9E9
| 568834 ||  || — || October 8, 2004 || Kitt Peak || Spacewatch ||  || align=right | 2.5 km || 
|-id=835 bgcolor=#E9E9E9
| 568835 ||  || — || October 8, 2004 || Palomar || NEAT ||  || align=right | 2.8 km || 
|-id=836 bgcolor=#E9E9E9
| 568836 ||  || — || January 14, 2010 || Mount Lemmon || Mount Lemmon Survey ||  || align=right | 1.9 km || 
|-id=837 bgcolor=#fefefe
| 568837 ||  || — || March 25, 2006 || Palomar || NEAT ||  || align=right data-sort-value="0.78" | 780 m || 
|-id=838 bgcolor=#E9E9E9
| 568838 ||  || — || January 8, 2006 || Kitt Peak || Spacewatch ||  || align=right | 1.9 km || 
|-id=839 bgcolor=#fefefe
| 568839 ||  || — || February 29, 2016 || Haleakala || Pan-STARRS || H || align=right data-sort-value="0.54" | 540 m || 
|-id=840 bgcolor=#fefefe
| 568840 ||  || — || September 29, 2011 || Kitt Peak || Spacewatch ||  || align=right data-sort-value="0.61" | 610 m || 
|-id=841 bgcolor=#E9E9E9
| 568841 ||  || — || October 8, 2004 || Kitt Peak || Spacewatch ||  || align=right | 1.1 km || 
|-id=842 bgcolor=#E9E9E9
| 568842 ||  || — || November 2, 2013 || Mount Lemmon || Mount Lemmon Survey ||  || align=right | 1.4 km || 
|-id=843 bgcolor=#fefefe
| 568843 ||  || — || July 7, 2014 || Haleakala || Pan-STARRS ||  || align=right data-sort-value="0.62" | 620 m || 
|-id=844 bgcolor=#E9E9E9
| 568844 ||  || — || September 3, 2013 || Mount Lemmon || Mount Lemmon Survey ||  || align=right | 1.8 km || 
|-id=845 bgcolor=#E9E9E9
| 568845 ||  || — || September 25, 2008 || Kitt Peak || Spacewatch ||  || align=right data-sort-value="0.94" | 940 m || 
|-id=846 bgcolor=#E9E9E9
| 568846 ||  || — || February 16, 2015 || Haleakala || Pan-STARRS ||  || align=right | 1.3 km || 
|-id=847 bgcolor=#E9E9E9
| 568847 ||  || — || February 19, 2015 || Haleakala || Pan-STARRS ||  || align=right | 1.3 km || 
|-id=848 bgcolor=#fefefe
| 568848 ||  || — || December 9, 2015 || Haleakala || Pan-STARRS ||  || align=right data-sort-value="0.59" | 590 m || 
|-id=849 bgcolor=#E9E9E9
| 568849 ||  || — || September 12, 2013 || Mount Lemmon || Mount Lemmon Survey ||  || align=right | 1.8 km || 
|-id=850 bgcolor=#E9E9E9
| 568850 ||  || — || September 18, 1995 || Kitt Peak || Spacewatch ||  || align=right | 1.1 km || 
|-id=851 bgcolor=#fefefe
| 568851 ||  || — || March 14, 2013 || Catalina || CSS ||  || align=right data-sort-value="0.62" | 620 m || 
|-id=852 bgcolor=#E9E9E9
| 568852 ||  || — || August 15, 2013 || Haleakala || Pan-STARRS ||  || align=right | 1.3 km || 
|-id=853 bgcolor=#E9E9E9
| 568853 ||  || — || November 1, 2013 || Mount Lemmon || Mount Lemmon Survey ||  || align=right | 1.0 km || 
|-id=854 bgcolor=#E9E9E9
| 568854 ||  || — || October 15, 2004 || Kitt Peak || Spacewatch ||  || align=right | 1.8 km || 
|-id=855 bgcolor=#d6d6d6
| 568855 ||  || — || September 29, 2009 || Mount Lemmon || Mount Lemmon Survey ||  || align=right | 2.4 km || 
|-id=856 bgcolor=#E9E9E9
| 568856 ||  || — || November 28, 2013 || Nogales || M. Schwartz, P. R. Holvorcem ||  || align=right | 1.8 km || 
|-id=857 bgcolor=#d6d6d6
| 568857 ||  || — || October 2, 2010 || Kitt Peak || Spacewatch ||  || align=right | 2.5 km || 
|-id=858 bgcolor=#E9E9E9
| 568858 ||  || — || January 17, 2015 || Mount Lemmon || Mount Lemmon Survey ||  || align=right | 1.8 km || 
|-id=859 bgcolor=#fefefe
| 568859 ||  || — || September 21, 2011 || Mount Lemmon || Mount Lemmon Survey ||  || align=right data-sort-value="0.62" | 620 m || 
|-id=860 bgcolor=#E9E9E9
| 568860 ||  || — || October 7, 2004 || Kitt Peak || Spacewatch ||  || align=right | 1.1 km || 
|-id=861 bgcolor=#E9E9E9
| 568861 ||  || — || November 1, 2013 || Mount Lemmon || Mount Lemmon Survey ||  || align=right | 1.2 km || 
|-id=862 bgcolor=#E9E9E9
| 568862 ||  || — || April 5, 2016 || Haleakala || Pan-STARRS ||  || align=right | 1.0 km || 
|-id=863 bgcolor=#E9E9E9
| 568863 ||  || — || September 25, 1995 || Kitt Peak || Spacewatch ||  || align=right | 1.2 km || 
|-id=864 bgcolor=#fefefe
| 568864 ||  || — || November 19, 2008 || Kitt Peak || Spacewatch ||  || align=right data-sort-value="0.68" | 680 m || 
|-id=865 bgcolor=#d6d6d6
| 568865 ||  || — || November 12, 2010 || Kitt Peak || Spacewatch ||  || align=right | 2.6 km || 
|-id=866 bgcolor=#E9E9E9
| 568866 ||  || — || October 18, 2004 || Socorro || LINEAR ||  || align=right | 1.4 km || 
|-id=867 bgcolor=#d6d6d6
| 568867 ||  || — || October 13, 2004 || Kitt Peak || Spacewatch ||  || align=right | 3.8 km || 
|-id=868 bgcolor=#fefefe
| 568868 ||  || — || September 23, 2011 || Haleakala || Pan-STARRS ||  || align=right data-sort-value="0.95" | 950 m || 
|-id=869 bgcolor=#E9E9E9
| 568869 ||  || — || October 23, 2004 || Kitt Peak || Spacewatch ||  || align=right | 1.3 km || 
|-id=870 bgcolor=#fefefe
| 568870 ||  || — || October 23, 2004 || Kitt Peak || Spacewatch || H || align=right data-sort-value="0.47" | 470 m || 
|-id=871 bgcolor=#E9E9E9
| 568871 ||  || — || October 23, 2004 || Kitt Peak || Spacewatch ||  || align=right | 1.4 km || 
|-id=872 bgcolor=#fefefe
| 568872 ||  || — || October 23, 2004 || Kitt Peak || Spacewatch ||  || align=right data-sort-value="0.49" | 490 m || 
|-id=873 bgcolor=#E9E9E9
| 568873 ||  || — || November 3, 2004 || Kitt Peak || Spacewatch ||  || align=right | 2.2 km || 
|-id=874 bgcolor=#E9E9E9
| 568874 ||  || — || November 3, 2004 || Palomar || NEAT ||  || align=right | 2.0 km || 
|-id=875 bgcolor=#E9E9E9
| 568875 ||  || — || November 3, 2004 || Kitt Peak || Spacewatch ||  || align=right data-sort-value="0.99" | 990 m || 
|-id=876 bgcolor=#fefefe
| 568876 ||  || — || October 23, 2004 || Kitt Peak || Spacewatch ||  || align=right data-sort-value="0.65" | 650 m || 
|-id=877 bgcolor=#fefefe
| 568877 ||  || — || November 4, 2004 || Kitt Peak || Spacewatch ||  || align=right data-sort-value="0.78" | 780 m || 
|-id=878 bgcolor=#E9E9E9
| 568878 ||  || — || November 9, 2004 || Catalina || CSS ||  || align=right | 1.8 km || 
|-id=879 bgcolor=#E9E9E9
| 568879 ||  || — || October 10, 2004 || Kitt Peak || L. H. Wasserman, J. R. Lovering ||  || align=right | 2.3 km || 
|-id=880 bgcolor=#E9E9E9
| 568880 ||  || — || November 7, 2004 || Palomar || NEAT ||  || align=right | 2.4 km || 
|-id=881 bgcolor=#fefefe
| 568881 ||  || — || November 3, 2004 || Kitt Peak || Spacewatch ||  || align=right data-sort-value="0.70" | 700 m || 
|-id=882 bgcolor=#E9E9E9
| 568882 ||  || — || November 4, 2004 || Kitt Peak || Spacewatch ||  || align=right | 2.0 km || 
|-id=883 bgcolor=#E9E9E9
| 568883 ||  || — || November 11, 2004 || Kitt Peak || Spacewatch ||  || align=right | 1.3 km || 
|-id=884 bgcolor=#fefefe
| 568884 ||  || — || November 11, 2004 || Kitt Peak || Spacewatch ||  || align=right data-sort-value="0.62" | 620 m || 
|-id=885 bgcolor=#fefefe
| 568885 ||  || — || July 3, 2000 || Kitt Peak || Spacewatch ||  || align=right data-sort-value="0.75" | 750 m || 
|-id=886 bgcolor=#E9E9E9
| 568886 ||  || — || November 9, 2004 || Mauna Kea || Mauna Kea Obs. ||  || align=right data-sort-value="0.59" | 590 m || 
|-id=887 bgcolor=#fefefe
| 568887 ||  || — || November 9, 2004 || Mauna Kea || Mauna Kea Obs. ||  || align=right data-sort-value="0.51" | 510 m || 
|-id=888 bgcolor=#E9E9E9
| 568888 ||  || — || November 3, 2004 || Kitt Peak || Spacewatch ||  || align=right | 1.6 km || 
|-id=889 bgcolor=#E9E9E9
| 568889 ||  || — || October 27, 2008 || Mount Lemmon || Mount Lemmon Survey ||  || align=right | 2.4 km || 
|-id=890 bgcolor=#E9E9E9
| 568890 ||  || — || November 10, 2004 || Kitt Peak || Spacewatch ||  || align=right | 1.7 km || 
|-id=891 bgcolor=#E9E9E9
| 568891 ||  || — || November 2, 2013 || Mount Lemmon || Mount Lemmon Survey ||  || align=right | 1.8 km || 
|-id=892 bgcolor=#E9E9E9
| 568892 ||  || — || February 27, 2006 || Catalina || CSS ||  || align=right | 2.4 km || 
|-id=893 bgcolor=#E9E9E9
| 568893 ||  || — || November 4, 2004 || Kitt Peak || Spacewatch ||  || align=right | 1.2 km || 
|-id=894 bgcolor=#fefefe
| 568894 ||  || — || April 3, 2016 || Haleakala || Pan-STARRS ||  || align=right data-sort-value="0.68" | 680 m || 
|-id=895 bgcolor=#fefefe
| 568895 ||  || — || May 6, 2006 || Mount Lemmon || Mount Lemmon Survey ||  || align=right data-sort-value="0.60" | 600 m || 
|-id=896 bgcolor=#E9E9E9
| 568896 ||  || — || September 24, 1995 || Kitt Peak || Spacewatch ||  || align=right | 1.2 km || 
|-id=897 bgcolor=#fefefe
| 568897 ||  || — || December 29, 2014 || Mount Lemmon || Mount Lemmon Survey ||  || align=right data-sort-value="0.59" | 590 m || 
|-id=898 bgcolor=#fefefe
| 568898 ||  || — || October 19, 2011 || Mount Lemmon || Mount Lemmon Survey ||  || align=right data-sort-value="0.70" | 700 m || 
|-id=899 bgcolor=#E9E9E9
| 568899 ||  || — || January 21, 2015 || Haleakala || Pan-STARRS ||  || align=right | 1.7 km || 
|-id=900 bgcolor=#fefefe
| 568900 ||  || — || October 30, 2011 || Kitt Peak || Spacewatch ||  || align=right data-sort-value="0.58" | 580 m || 
|}

568901–569000 

|-bgcolor=#E9E9E9
| 568901 ||  || — || October 28, 1995 || Kitt Peak || Spacewatch ||  || align=right | 1.3 km || 
|-id=902 bgcolor=#E9E9E9
| 568902 ||  || — || September 6, 2008 || Catalina || CSS ||  || align=right | 1.3 km || 
|-id=903 bgcolor=#fefefe
| 568903 ||  || — || December 1, 2004 || Palomar || NEAT ||  || align=right data-sort-value="0.98" | 980 m || 
|-id=904 bgcolor=#d6d6d6
| 568904 ||  || — || November 30, 2004 || Palomar || NEAT ||  || align=right | 4.7 km || 
|-id=905 bgcolor=#d6d6d6
| 568905 ||  || — || September 27, 1992 || Kitt Peak || Spacewatch ||  || align=right | 2.6 km || 
|-id=906 bgcolor=#E9E9E9
| 568906 ||  || — || December 9, 2004 || Kitt Peak || Spacewatch ||  || align=right | 1.1 km || 
|-id=907 bgcolor=#E9E9E9
| 568907 ||  || — || December 9, 2004 || Kitt Peak || Spacewatch ||  || align=right | 1.0 km || 
|-id=908 bgcolor=#E9E9E9
| 568908 ||  || — || December 10, 2004 || Kitt Peak || Spacewatch ||  || align=right | 1.7 km || 
|-id=909 bgcolor=#C2FFFF
| 568909 ||  || — || November 26, 2003 || Kitt Peak || Spacewatch || L5 || align=right | 10 km || 
|-id=910 bgcolor=#E9E9E9
| 568910 ||  || — || December 11, 2004 || Kitt Peak || Spacewatch ||  || align=right | 1.9 km || 
|-id=911 bgcolor=#E9E9E9
| 568911 ||  || — || December 10, 2004 || Kitt Peak || Spacewatch ||  || align=right | 1.9 km || 
|-id=912 bgcolor=#fefefe
| 568912 ||  || — || December 12, 2004 || Kitt Peak || Spacewatch ||  || align=right data-sort-value="0.53" | 530 m || 
|-id=913 bgcolor=#fefefe
| 568913 ||  || — || December 2, 2004 || Kitt Peak || Spacewatch ||  || align=right data-sort-value="0.63" | 630 m || 
|-id=914 bgcolor=#E9E9E9
| 568914 ||  || — || December 13, 2004 || Kitt Peak || Spacewatch ||  || align=right | 3.1 km || 
|-id=915 bgcolor=#E9E9E9
| 568915 ||  || — || October 21, 1995 || Kitt Peak || Spacewatch ||  || align=right | 1.7 km || 
|-id=916 bgcolor=#E9E9E9
| 568916 ||  || — || December 14, 2004 || Kitt Peak || Spacewatch ||  || align=right | 1.9 km || 
|-id=917 bgcolor=#fefefe
| 568917 ||  || — || December 15, 2004 || Kitt Peak || Spacewatch ||  || align=right data-sort-value="0.75" | 750 m || 
|-id=918 bgcolor=#E9E9E9
| 568918 ||  || — || December 2, 2004 || Palomar || NEAT ||  || align=right | 1.3 km || 
|-id=919 bgcolor=#fefefe
| 568919 ||  || — || December 3, 2004 || Kitt Peak || Spacewatch ||  || align=right data-sort-value="0.52" | 520 m || 
|-id=920 bgcolor=#E9E9E9
| 568920 ||  || — || October 26, 1995 || Kitt Peak || Spacewatch ||  || align=right | 2.5 km || 
|-id=921 bgcolor=#E9E9E9
| 568921 ||  || — || September 22, 2008 || Mount Lemmon || Mount Lemmon Survey ||  || align=right | 1.8 km || 
|-id=922 bgcolor=#E9E9E9
| 568922 ||  || — || September 23, 2008 || Kitt Peak || Spacewatch ||  || align=right | 2.0 km || 
|-id=923 bgcolor=#E9E9E9
| 568923 ||  || — || November 28, 2013 || Mount Lemmon || Mount Lemmon Survey ||  || align=right | 1.8 km || 
|-id=924 bgcolor=#E9E9E9
| 568924 ||  || — || January 24, 2014 || Haleakala || Pan-STARRS ||  || align=right | 1.2 km || 
|-id=925 bgcolor=#E9E9E9
| 568925 ||  || — || October 10, 2008 || Mount Lemmon || Mount Lemmon Survey ||  || align=right | 1.7 km || 
|-id=926 bgcolor=#E9E9E9
| 568926 ||  || — || September 9, 2008 || Mount Lemmon || Mount Lemmon Survey ||  || align=right | 1.6 km || 
|-id=927 bgcolor=#E9E9E9
| 568927 ||  || — || October 8, 2008 || Kitt Peak || Spacewatch ||  || align=right | 2.1 km || 
|-id=928 bgcolor=#d6d6d6
| 568928 ||  || — || September 15, 2013 || Mount Lemmon || Mount Lemmon Survey ||  || align=right | 2.2 km || 
|-id=929 bgcolor=#E9E9E9
| 568929 ||  || — || October 7, 2008 || Mount Lemmon || Mount Lemmon Survey ||  || align=right | 1.5 km || 
|-id=930 bgcolor=#E9E9E9
| 568930 ||  || — || October 21, 2008 || Mount Lemmon || Mount Lemmon Survey ||  || align=right | 2.1 km || 
|-id=931 bgcolor=#fefefe
| 568931 ||  || — || December 31, 2008 || Mount Lemmon || Mount Lemmon Survey ||  || align=right data-sort-value="0.86" | 860 m || 
|-id=932 bgcolor=#E9E9E9
| 568932 ||  || — || December 19, 2004 || Mount Lemmon || Mount Lemmon Survey ||  || align=right | 1.7 km || 
|-id=933 bgcolor=#fefefe
| 568933 ||  || — || December 14, 2004 || Catalina || CSS ||  || align=right data-sort-value="0.87" | 870 m || 
|-id=934 bgcolor=#fefefe
| 568934 ||  || — || December 19, 2004 || Mount Lemmon || Mount Lemmon Survey ||  || align=right data-sort-value="0.67" | 670 m || 
|-id=935 bgcolor=#E9E9E9
| 568935 ||  || — || December 19, 2004 || Mount Lemmon || Mount Lemmon Survey ||  || align=right | 1.7 km || 
|-id=936 bgcolor=#E9E9E9
| 568936 ||  || — || December 19, 2004 || Mount Lemmon || Mount Lemmon Survey ||  || align=right | 2.3 km || 
|-id=937 bgcolor=#E9E9E9
| 568937 ||  || — || December 16, 2004 || Kitt Peak || Spacewatch ||  || align=right | 2.0 km || 
|-id=938 bgcolor=#E9E9E9
| 568938 ||  || — || September 23, 2008 || Mount Lemmon || Mount Lemmon Survey ||  || align=right | 1.7 km || 
|-id=939 bgcolor=#d6d6d6
| 568939 ||  || — || November 9, 2009 || Mount Lemmon || Mount Lemmon Survey ||  || align=right | 2.7 km || 
|-id=940 bgcolor=#fefefe
| 568940 ||  || — || January 18, 2016 || Haleakala || Pan-STARRS ||  || align=right data-sort-value="0.55" | 550 m || 
|-id=941 bgcolor=#E9E9E9
| 568941 ||  || — || September 21, 2017 || Haleakala || Pan-STARRS ||  || align=right | 1.7 km || 
|-id=942 bgcolor=#E9E9E9
| 568942 ||  || — || December 18, 2004 || Kitt Peak || Spacewatch ||  || align=right | 1.1 km || 
|-id=943 bgcolor=#fefefe
| 568943 ||  || — || January 13, 2005 || Kitt Peak || Spacewatch ||  || align=right data-sort-value="0.69" | 690 m || 
|-id=944 bgcolor=#E9E9E9
| 568944 ||  || — || January 13, 1996 || Kitt Peak || Spacewatch ||  || align=right | 1.9 km || 
|-id=945 bgcolor=#E9E9E9
| 568945 ||  || — || September 25, 2012 || Mount Lemmon || Mount Lemmon Survey ||  || align=right | 2.2 km || 
|-id=946 bgcolor=#E9E9E9
| 568946 ||  || — || November 28, 2013 || Haleakala || Pan-STARRS ||  || align=right | 2.2 km || 
|-id=947 bgcolor=#fefefe
| 568947 ||  || — || January 19, 2005 || Kitt Peak || Spacewatch ||  || align=right data-sort-value="0.65" | 650 m || 
|-id=948 bgcolor=#E9E9E9
| 568948 ||  || — || January 19, 2005 || Kitt Peak || Spacewatch ||  || align=right | 1.8 km || 
|-id=949 bgcolor=#C2FFFF
| 568949 ||  || — || January 16, 2005 || Mauna Kea || Mauna Kea Obs. || L5 || align=right | 6.4 km || 
|-id=950 bgcolor=#E9E9E9
| 568950 ||  || — || January 13, 2005 || Kitt Peak || Spacewatch ||  || align=right | 1.9 km || 
|-id=951 bgcolor=#fefefe
| 568951 ||  || — || March 9, 2002 || Kitt Peak || Spacewatch ||  || align=right data-sort-value="0.83" | 830 m || 
|-id=952 bgcolor=#E9E9E9
| 568952 ||  || — || January 16, 2005 || Mauna Kea || Mauna Kea Obs. ||  || align=right | 1.6 km || 
|-id=953 bgcolor=#E9E9E9
| 568953 ||  || — || January 15, 2005 || Kitt Peak || Spacewatch ||  || align=right | 2.2 km || 
|-id=954 bgcolor=#d6d6d6
| 568954 ||  || — || January 16, 2005 || Mauna Kea || Mauna Kea Obs. ||  || align=right | 1.7 km || 
|-id=955 bgcolor=#fefefe
| 568955 ||  || — || January 16, 2005 || Mauna Kea || Mauna Kea Obs. ||  || align=right data-sort-value="0.59" | 590 m || 
|-id=956 bgcolor=#d6d6d6
| 568956 ||  || — || January 16, 2005 || Mauna Kea || Mauna Kea Obs. ||  || align=right | 1.8 km || 
|-id=957 bgcolor=#E9E9E9
| 568957 ||  || — || January 16, 2005 || Mauna Kea || Mauna Kea Obs. ||  || align=right | 1.6 km || 
|-id=958 bgcolor=#fefefe
| 568958 ||  || — || January 16, 2005 || Mauna Kea || Mauna Kea Obs. ||  || align=right data-sort-value="0.75" | 750 m || 
|-id=959 bgcolor=#d6d6d6
| 568959 ||  || — || January 16, 2005 || Mauna Kea || Mauna Kea Obs. ||  || align=right | 1.8 km || 
|-id=960 bgcolor=#E9E9E9
| 568960 ||  || — || October 6, 2008 || Mount Lemmon || Mount Lemmon Survey ||  || align=right | 2.2 km || 
|-id=961 bgcolor=#C2FFFF
| 568961 ||  || — || April 7, 2008 || Kitt Peak || Spacewatch || L5 || align=right | 8.8 km || 
|-id=962 bgcolor=#E9E9E9
| 568962 ||  || — || October 25, 2008 || Kitt Peak || Spacewatch ||  || align=right | 2.1 km || 
|-id=963 bgcolor=#E9E9E9
| 568963 ||  || — || January 17, 2005 || Kitt Peak || Spacewatch ||  || align=right | 1.3 km || 
|-id=964 bgcolor=#E9E9E9
| 568964 ||  || — || June 7, 2016 || Haleakala || Pan-STARRS ||  || align=right | 2.0 km || 
|-id=965 bgcolor=#fefefe
| 568965 ||  || — || January 16, 2005 || Kitt Peak || Spacewatch ||  || align=right data-sort-value="0.65" | 650 m || 
|-id=966 bgcolor=#d6d6d6
| 568966 ||  || — || February 13, 2005 || La Silla || A. Boattini ||  || align=right | 2.2 km || 
|-id=967 bgcolor=#E9E9E9
| 568967 ||  || — || January 19, 2005 || Kitt Peak || Spacewatch ||  || align=right | 2.1 km || 
|-id=968 bgcolor=#E9E9E9
| 568968 ||  || — || July 18, 2007 || Mount Lemmon || Mount Lemmon Survey ||  || align=right | 2.5 km || 
|-id=969 bgcolor=#E9E9E9
| 568969 ||  || — || January 13, 2018 || Mount Lemmon || Mount Lemmon Survey ||  || align=right | 1.5 km || 
|-id=970 bgcolor=#fefefe
| 568970 ||  || — || March 16, 2012 || Mount Lemmon || Mount Lemmon Survey ||  || align=right data-sort-value="0.62" | 620 m || 
|-id=971 bgcolor=#E9E9E9
| 568971 ||  || — || October 8, 2008 || Mount Lemmon || Mount Lemmon Survey ||  || align=right | 1.8 km || 
|-id=972 bgcolor=#C2FFFF
| 568972 ||  || — || May 3, 2009 || Mount Lemmon || Mount Lemmon Survey || L5 || align=right | 8.4 km || 
|-id=973 bgcolor=#E9E9E9
| 568973 ||  || — || November 24, 2016 || Haleakala || Pan-STARRS ||  || align=right | 1.0 km || 
|-id=974 bgcolor=#C2FFFF
| 568974 ||  || — || June 14, 2009 || Mount Lemmon || Mount Lemmon Survey || L5 || align=right | 6.2 km || 
|-id=975 bgcolor=#E9E9E9
| 568975 ||  || — || February 1, 2005 || Kitt Peak || Spacewatch ||  || align=right | 1.7 km || 
|-id=976 bgcolor=#fefefe
| 568976 ||  || — || February 2, 2005 || Catalina || CSS ||  || align=right data-sort-value="0.76" | 760 m || 
|-id=977 bgcolor=#fefefe
| 568977 ||  || — || February 4, 2005 || Mount Lemmon || Mount Lemmon Survey ||  || align=right data-sort-value="0.54" | 540 m || 
|-id=978 bgcolor=#E9E9E9
| 568978 ||  || — || October 25, 2012 || Mount Lemmon || Mount Lemmon Survey ||  || align=right | 1.6 km || 
|-id=979 bgcolor=#E9E9E9
| 568979 ||  || — || February 4, 2005 || Kitt Peak || Spacewatch ||  || align=right | 1.1 km || 
|-id=980 bgcolor=#d6d6d6
| 568980 ||  || — || February 2, 2005 || Kitt Peak || Spacewatch ||  || align=right | 2.8 km || 
|-id=981 bgcolor=#E9E9E9
| 568981 ||  || — || November 19, 2008 || Kitt Peak || Spacewatch ||  || align=right | 1.9 km || 
|-id=982 bgcolor=#fefefe
| 568982 ||  || — || December 16, 2011 || XuYi || PMO NEO ||  || align=right data-sort-value="0.70" | 700 m || 
|-id=983 bgcolor=#fefefe
| 568983 ||  || — || June 7, 2013 || Mount Lemmon || Mount Lemmon Survey ||  || align=right data-sort-value="0.97" | 970 m || 
|-id=984 bgcolor=#fefefe
| 568984 ||  || — || February 20, 2009 || Kitt Peak || Spacewatch ||  || align=right data-sort-value="0.72" | 720 m || 
|-id=985 bgcolor=#fefefe
| 568985 ||  || — || February 2, 2005 || Kitt Peak || Spacewatch ||  || align=right data-sort-value="0.89" | 890 m || 
|-id=986 bgcolor=#fefefe
| 568986 ||  || — || March 24, 2009 || Mount Lemmon || Mount Lemmon Survey ||  || align=right data-sort-value="0.75" | 750 m || 
|-id=987 bgcolor=#fefefe
| 568987 ||  || — || November 20, 2007 || Mount Lemmon || Mount Lemmon Survey ||  || align=right data-sort-value="0.66" | 660 m || 
|-id=988 bgcolor=#E9E9E9
| 568988 ||  || — || August 1, 2017 || Haleakala || Pan-STARRS ||  || align=right | 2.8 km || 
|-id=989 bgcolor=#C2FFFF
| 568989 ||  || — || February 4, 2006 || Kitt Peak || Spacewatch || L5 || align=right | 8.4 km || 
|-id=990 bgcolor=#fefefe
| 568990 ||  || — || February 18, 2005 || La Silla || A. Boattini ||  || align=right data-sort-value="0.61" | 610 m || 
|-id=991 bgcolor=#E9E9E9
| 568991 ||  || — || March 3, 2005 || Kitt Peak || Spacewatch ||  || align=right | 1.8 km || 
|-id=992 bgcolor=#E9E9E9
| 568992 ||  || — || March 3, 2005 || Catalina || CSS ||  || align=right | 1.6 km || 
|-id=993 bgcolor=#fefefe
| 568993 ||  || — || January 16, 2005 || Kitt Peak || Spacewatch ||  || align=right data-sort-value="0.62" | 620 m || 
|-id=994 bgcolor=#d6d6d6
| 568994 ||  || — || November 20, 2003 || Palomar || NEAT || 7:4 || align=right | 4.4 km || 
|-id=995 bgcolor=#E9E9E9
| 568995 ||  || — || March 4, 2005 || Mount Lemmon || Mount Lemmon Survey ||  || align=right | 1.2 km || 
|-id=996 bgcolor=#d6d6d6
| 568996 ||  || — || March 5, 2005 || La Silla || R. Gauderon, R. Behrend ||  || align=right | 2.2 km || 
|-id=997 bgcolor=#E9E9E9
| 568997 ||  || — || February 16, 2005 || La Silla || A. Boattini ||  || align=right | 2.2 km || 
|-id=998 bgcolor=#E9E9E9
| 568998 ||  || — || March 10, 2005 || Mount Lemmon || Mount Lemmon Survey ||  || align=right | 1.4 km || 
|-id=999 bgcolor=#fefefe
| 568999 ||  || — || March 9, 2005 || Mount Lemmon || Mount Lemmon Survey ||  || align=right data-sort-value="0.70" | 700 m || 
|-id=000 bgcolor=#fefefe
| 569000 ||  || — || March 10, 2005 || Mount Lemmon || Mount Lemmon Survey ||  || align=right data-sort-value="0.54" | 540 m || 
|}

References

External links 
 Discovery Circumstances: Numbered Minor Planets (565001)–(570000) (IAU Minor Planet Center)

0568